= Topological modular forms =

In mathematics, topological modular forms (tmf) is the name of a spectrum that describes a generalized cohomology theory. In concrete terms, for any integer n there is a topological space $\operatorname{tmf}^{n}$, and these spaces are equipped with certain maps between them, so that for any topological space X, one obtains an abelian group structure on the set $\operatorname{tmf}^{n}(X)$ of homotopy classes of continuous maps from X to $\operatorname{tmf}^{n}$. One feature that distinguishes tmf is the fact that its coefficient ring, $\operatorname{tmf}^{0}$(point), is almost the same as the graded ring of holomorphic modular forms with integral cusp expansions. Indeed, these two rings become isomorphic after inverting the primes 2 and 3, but this inversion erases a lot of torsion information in the coefficient ring.

The spectrum of topological modular forms is constructed as the global sections of a sheaf of E-infinity ring spectra on the moduli stack of (generalized) elliptic curves. This theory has relations to the theory of modular forms in number theory, the homotopy groups of spheres, and conjectural index theories on loop spaces of manifolds. tmf was first constructed by Michael Hopkins and Haynes Miller; many of the computations can be found in preprints and articles by Paul Goerss, Hopkins, Mark Mahowald, Miller, Charles Rezk, and Tilman Bauer.

== Construction ==
The original construction of tmf uses the obstruction theory of Hopkins, Miller, and Paul Goerss, and is based on ideas of Dwyer, Kan, and Stover. In this approach, one defines a presheaf O^{top} ("top" stands for topological) of multiplicative cohomology theories on the etale site of the moduli stack of elliptic curves and shows that this can be lifted in an essentially unique way to a sheaf of E-infinity ring spectra. This sheaf has the following property: to any etale elliptic curve over a ring R, it assigns an E-infinity ring spectrum (a classical elliptic cohomology theory) whose associated formal group is the formal group of that elliptic curve.

A second construction, due to Jacob Lurie, constructs tmf rather by describing the moduli problem it represents and applying general representability theory to then show existence: just as the moduli stack of elliptic curves represents the functor that assigns to a ring the category of elliptic curves over it, the stack together with the sheaf of E-infinity ring spectra represents the functor that assigns to an E-infinity ring its category of oriented derived elliptic curves, appropriately interpreted. These constructions work over the moduli stack of smooth elliptic curves, and they also work for the Deligne-Mumford compactification of this moduli stack, in which elliptic curves with nodal singularities are included. TMF is the spectrum that results from the global sections over the moduli stack of smooth curves, and tmf is the spectrum arising as the global sections of the Deligne–Mumford compactification.

TMF is a periodic version of the connective tmf. While the ring spectra used to construct TMF are periodic with period 2, TMF itself has period 576. The periodicity is related to the modular discriminant.

== Relations to other parts of mathematics ==
Some interest in tmf comes from string theory and conformal field theory. Graeme Segal first proposed in the 1980s to provide a geometric construction of elliptic cohomology (the precursor to tmf) as some kind of moduli space of conformal field theories, and these ideas have been continued and expanded by Stephan Stolz and Peter Teichner. Their program is to try to construct TMF as a moduli space of supersymmetric Euclidean field theories.

In work more directly motivated by string theory, Edward Witten introduced the Witten genus, a homomorphism from the string bordism ring to the ring of modular forms, using equivariant index theory on a formal neighborhood of the trivial locus in the loop space of a manifold. This associates to any spin manifold with vanishing half first Pontryagin class a modular form. By work of Hopkins, Matthew Ando, Charles Rezk and Neil Strickland, the Witten genus can be lifted to topology. That is, there is a map from the string bordism spectrum to tmf, the Ando–Hopkins–Rezk orientation, such that the Witten genus is recovered as the composition of the induced map on the homotopy groups of these spectra and a map of the homotopy groups of tmf to modular forms. This allowed to prove certain divisibility statements about the Witten genus. The orientation of tmf is in analogy with the Atiyah–Bott–Shapiro orientation from the spin bordism spectrum to classical K-theory, which is a lift of the Dirac equation to topology.
