= Constantin Teleman =

Romanian-American mathematician

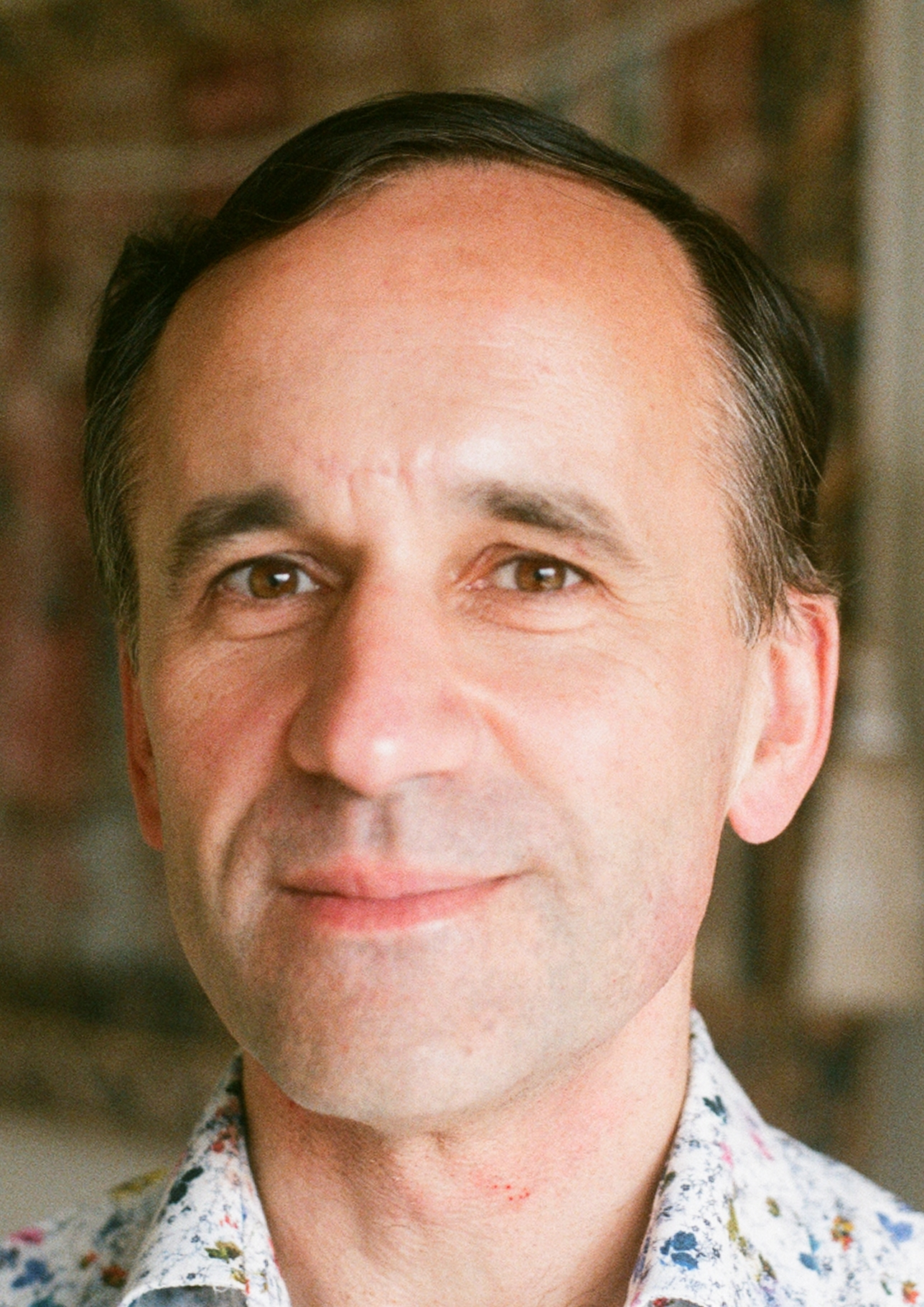
- Teleman in 2017
- Born: 1968 (age 57–58)
- Education: Harvard University (AB, AM); University of Cambridge (PhD)
- Known for: Algebraic geometry; algebraic topology; Lie groups; loop groups; mathematical physics
- Awards: Whitehead Prize (2002); Senior Berwick Prize (2015)
- Scientific career
- Fields: Mathematics
- Workplaces: Stanford University; University of Cambridge; University of Texas at Austin; University of Edinburgh; University of California, Berkeley
- Doctoral advisor: Raoul Bott; Graeme Segal

Constantin S. Teleman (born in 1968) is a Romanian-American mathematician. He studies algebraic geometry, algebraic topology, Lie groups and loop groups as well as their representations and their connections to mathematical physics, notably quantum field theory.

Teleman began studying at Harvard University in 1987 (that same year, he was a Putnam Fellow) and obtained his master's degree in 1991. He then received his doctoral degree in 1994 under the direction of Raoul Bott (and Graeme Segal after he worked at the University of Cambridge) with a thesis titled "Lie Algebra Cohomology and the Fusion Rules". He was then the Szegö assistant professor at Stanford University and Research Fellow at St John's College at the University of Cambridge. In 1999, became an assistant professor at the University of Texas at Austin and lecturer in 2001, then in 2003 a reader for St John's College at Cambridge. In 2007, he was a professor at the University of Edinburgh. He is now a professor at UC Berkeley.

== Prizes and honors ==
In 2002, he received the Whitehead Prize for his contributions to representations of infinite-dimensional groups, particularly loop groups. In 2015, he was a Senior Berwick prize laureat along with Daniel Freed and Michael J. Hopkins for their article Loop groups and twisted K-theory. They proved the isomorphism between the twisted equivariant K-theory of a compact Lie group and the Verlinde algebra of its loop group. In 2014, he was an invited speaker at the International Congress of Mathematicians in Seoul.

== Selected publications ==
- with Daniel Freed, "Relative Quantum Field Theory", Commun. Math. Physics, vol. 326, 2014, p. 459–476, Arxiv
- with Edward Frenkel, "Geometric Langlands correspondence near opers", J. Ramanujan Math. Soc. 28 A, 2013, p. 123–147, Arxiv
- "The structure of 2D semi-simple field theories", Invent. Math., vol. 188, 2012, p. 525–588, Arxiv
- with Daniel Freed, Michael J. Hopkins, "Loop groups and twisted K-theory", Volume 1, Journal of Topology, vol. 4, 2011, p. 737–799, Tome 2, J. Amer. Math. Soc., vol. 26, 2013, p. 595–644, Tome 3, Ann. of Math., vol. 174, 2011, p. 947–1007, Volume 1, Arxiv, Volume 2, Volume 3, Arxiv
- with Daniel Freed, Michael J. Hopkins, Jacob Lurie, "Topological Quantum Field Theories from Compact Lie Groups", in P. R. Kotiuga (éd.), A celebration of the mathematical legacy of Raoul Bott, AMS 2010, Arxiv
- with Christopher T. Woodward, "The index formula for the moduli of G-bundles on a curve". Ann. of Math., vol. 170, 2009, p. 495–527, Arxiv
- with Susanna Fishel, Ian Grojnowski, "The strong Macdonald conjecture and Hodge theory on the loop Grassmannian", Ann. of Math., vol. 168, 2008, p. 175–220, Arxiv
- "The quantization conjecture revisited", Ann. of Math., vol. 152, 2000, p. 1–43, Arxiv
