= Talitha Washington =

American mathematician

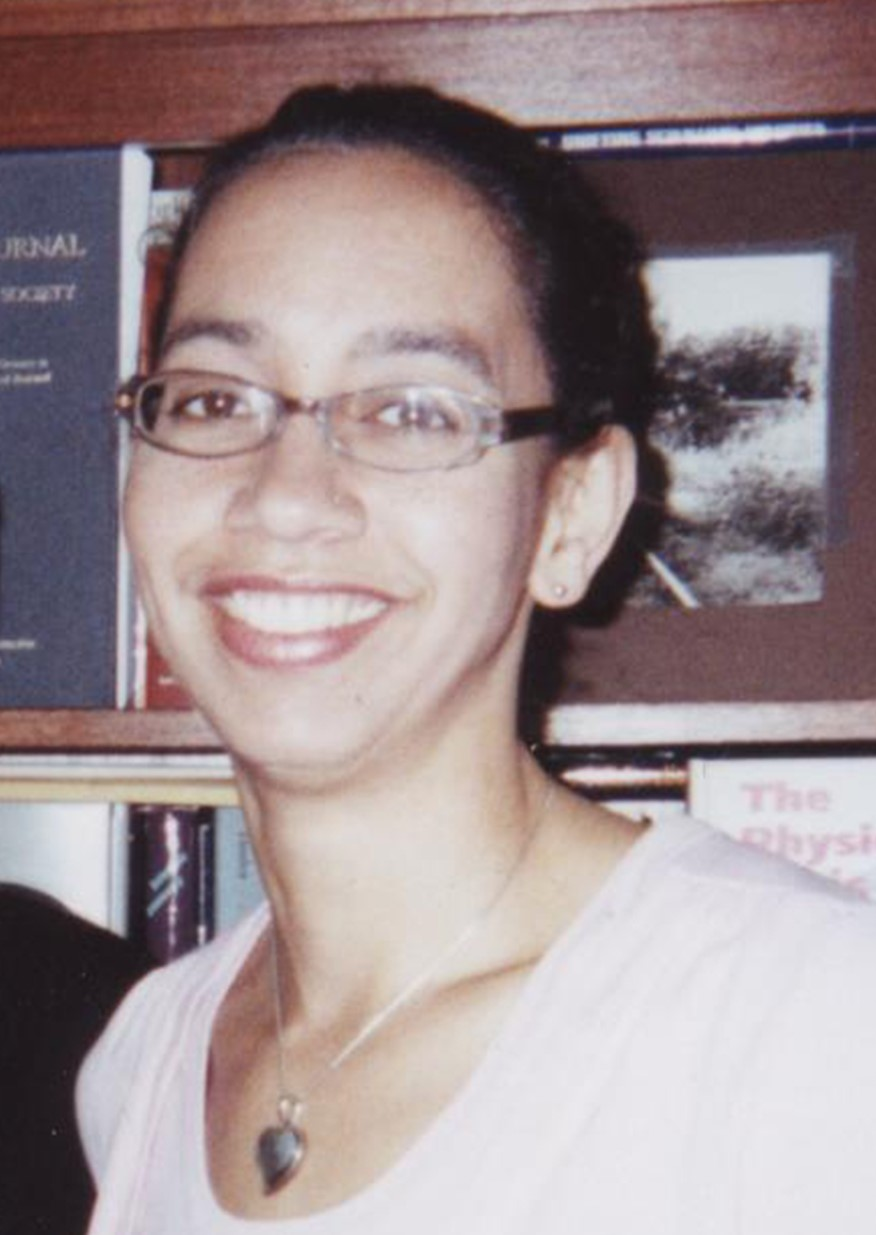
- Washington in 2003
- Born: 1974 (age 51–52); Frankfort, Indiana, U.S.

Academic background
- Education: Spelman College (BS); University of Connecticut (MS, PhD)
- Thesis: Mathematical Model of Proteins Acting as On/Off Switches
- Doctoral advisor: Yung-Sze Choi

Academic work
- Sub-discipline: Nonstandard finite difference scheme; Population models; Black–Scholes equation; One-dimensional systems
- Institutions: Duke University (2001–2003); College of New Rochelle (2003–2005); University of Evansville (2005–2011); Howard University (2011–2020); National Science Foundation; Atlanta University Center Consortium (AUCC) (2020–present)

Talitha Washington (born 1974) is an American mathematician and academic who specializes in applied mathematics and STEM education policy. She was recognized by Mathematically Gifted & Black as a Black History Month 2018 Honoree. Washington became the 26th president of the Association for Women in Mathematics in 2023.

== Education and career ==
Washington was born in Frankfort, Indiana, and adopted at a young age by Ruthanne and Walter Wangerin. She was raised in Evansville, Indiana, and attended Benjamin Bosse High School. After serving in Costa Rica with the American Field Service, she earned a Bachelor of Science in Mathematics from Spelman College in 1996. She then attended the University of Connecticut, earning a master's degree in 1998 and a Ph.D. in 2001. Her doctoral thesis was Mathematical Model of Proteins Acting as On/Off Switches, under the supervision of Yung-Sze Choi.

Washington served on the faculty of Duke University from 2001 to 2003, the College of New Rochelle from 2003 to 2005, the University of Evansville from 2005 to 2011, and Howard University, starting in 2011, where she became associate professor of mathematics. After a few years on leave as a program director at the National Science Foundation, in 2020 she became the inaugural director of the Atlanta University Center Consortium (AUCC) Data Science Initiative. In 2022 she became president-elect of the Association for Women in Mathematics and assumed the presidency on February 1, 2023. In 2025, Washington was named the executive director of the Howard University Center for Applied Data Science and Analytics and the Sean McCleese Endowed Chair in Computer Science, Race, and Social Justice.

Washington's research interests include nonstandard finite difference (NSFD) schemes for certain systems of differential equations, including population models, one-dimensional systems, and the Black–Scholes equation.

== Education policy and awards ==
Washington is active in education policy, especially best practices on achieving racial and ethnic diversity in STEM. At the NSF, she has served as co-lead of the Hispanic-Serving Institutions Program and is a graduate of the STEM diversity organization SACNAS. She serves on the Council of the American Mathematical Society and served on the Executive Committee of the Association for Women in Mathematics (AWM).

Washington helped to champion the once-forgotten mathematician Elbert Frank Cox (1895–1969) from her hometown of Evansville, leading to the November 2006 unveiling of a plaque honoring the longtime Howard professor as the first African-American scholar to earn a doctorate in mathematics. She received the 2019 Black Engineer of the Year Awards STEM Innovator Award.

Talitha Washington was named a Fellow of the American Mathematical Society, Class of 2021. Her citation read "For contributions to broadening the participation of underrepresented groups, and service to the mathematical profession". Washington was also named a Fellow of the AWM, Class of 2021, "for her dedication to raise awareness of African American women in STEM; for her lifelong promotion of Historically Black Colleges and Universities; and for her unwavering dedication to the National Association of Mathematicians." On February 1, 2022, she became president-elect of the AWM. She was elected to the 2022 class of Fellows of the American Association for the Advancement of Science (AAAS).

== Selected publications ==
Applied mathematics

- R. E. Mickens and T. M. Washington. "A Note on Exact Finite Difference Schemes for the Differential Equations Satisfied by the Jacobi Cosine and Sine Functions" Journal of Difference Equations and Applications, Vol. 19, Iss. 2 (2013), pp. 1042–1047.
- T. M. Washington. NSFD "Representations for Polynomial Terms Appearing in the Potential Functions of 1-Dimensional Conservative Systems" Computers & Mathematics with Applications, Vol. 66, Iss. 11 (2013), pp. 2251–2258.
- R. E. Mickens and T. M. Washington. NSFD "Discretizations of Interacting Population Models Satisfying Conservation Laws" Computers & Mathematics with Applications, Vol. 66, Iss. 11 (2013), pp. 2307–2316.
- E. H. Goins and T. M. Washington. "On the Generalized Climbing Stairs Problem" Ars Combinatoria, Vol. 117 (2014), pp. 183–190.
- R. E. Mickens, J. Munyakazi and T. M. Washington. "A Note on the Exact Discretization for a Cauchy-Euler ODE: Application to the Black-Scholes Equation" Journal of Difference Equations and Applications, Vol. 21, Iss. 7 (2015), pp. 547–552.
- O. Adekanye and T. Washington. "Numerical Comparison of Nonstandard Schemes for the Airy Equation" International Journal of Applied Mathematical Research, Vol. 6, Iss. 4 (2017), pp. 141–146.
- O. Adekanye and T. Washington. "Nonstandard Finite Difference Scheme for a Tacoma Narrows Bridge Model" Applied Mathematical Modelling, Accepted May 21, 2018.

STEM education policy

- T. M. Washington. "Evansville Honors the First Black Ph.D. in Mathematics and His Family" The Notices of the American Mathematical Society, Vol. 55, Iss. 5 (2008), pp. 588–589.
- M. J. Wolyniak, C. J. Alvarez, V. Chandrasekaran, T. M. Grana, A. Holgado, C. J. Jones, R. W. Morris, A. L. Pereira, J. Stamm, T. M. Washington, and Y. Yang. "Building Better Scientists Through Cross-disciplinary Collaboration in Synthetic Biology: A Meeting Report from the Genome Consortium for Active Teaching Workshop 2010" CBE-Life Sciences Education, Vol. 9, No. 4 (2010), pp. 399–404.
- R. De Veaux, M. Agarwal, M. Averett, B. Baumer, A. Bray, T. Bressoud, L. Bryant, L. Cheng, A. Francis, R. Gould, A. Y. Kim, M. Kretchmar, Q. Lu, A. Moskol, D. Nolan, R. Pelayo, S. Raleigh, R. J. Sethi, M. Sondjaja, N. Tiruviluamala, P. Uhlig, T. Washington, C. Wesley, D. White, P. Ye. "Curriculum Guidelines for Undergraduate Programs in Data Science" Annual Review of Statistics and Its Application, Vol. 4 (2017), pp. 2.1-2.16.
- V. R. Morris and T. Washington. "The Role of Professional Societies in STEM Diversity" Journal of the National Technical Association, Vol. 87, Iss. 1 (2017), pp. 22–31.
- T. Washington. "Behind Every Successful Woman, There are a Few Good Men" The Notices of the AMS, Vol. 65, Iss. 02 (2018), pp. 132–134.
