= Gizem Karaali =

Turkish-born American mathematician

Gizem Karaali is a Professor of Mathematics at Pomona College in Claremont, CA.

== Background and education ==
Mathematician Gizem Karaali is originally from Istanbul, Turkey. Her father was an electrical engineer and her mother was a professor of nutrition science. She graduated from UAA (the Üsküdar American Academy) and then went on to Boğaziçi University where she graduated (with honors) in 1997 with undergraduate degrees in electrical engineering and mathematics. Karaali earned her PhD in mathematics at the University of California, Berkeley, in 2004. Her dissertation was "r-Matrices on Lie Superalgebras" and her advisors were Nikolai Jurieviç Reshetikhin and Vera V. Serganova. After a two-year postdoctoral position at the University of California, Santa Barbara, she moved on to Pomona College in 2006.

== Career ==
Karaali's services to the scholarly and mathematical communities include editorship positions for three journals. She is the co-editor, along with Mark Huber, of the Journal of Humanistic Mathematics—an online, open-access journal that focuses on the connections of mathematics to disciplines in the humanities. She is an Associate Editor for The Mathematical Intelligencer, a journal that offers—to mathematicians and those outside the field—articles about mathematics and mathematicians and about the history and culture of mathematics. She also is an Associate Editor for Numeracy—the open-access, peer-reviewed journal of the National Numeracy Network (NNN). Her Faculty page at Pomona College offers a list of featured and peer reviewed publications and of awarded honors. Her CV includes a more comprehensive list of her activities and publications, including some poetry.

In a personal essay, Karaali has described how teaching an interdisciplinary first-year seminar led her to think about math, writing, and social justice in new ways. Karaali and the mathematician Lily Khadjavi have co-edited two books, Mathematics for Social Justice: Resources for the College Classroom and Mathematics for Social Justice: Focusing on Quantitative Reasoning and Statistics, which provide resources for mathematics instructors who want to add social justice topics to their courses or create new mathematics courses centered around social justice. The books are published by the MAA Press, an imprint of the American Mathematical Society.

== Awards and honors ==
In 2010, Karaali won the Young Investigator Award from the National Security Agency. She stated that she would use the prize winnings to continue her research on Yang-Baxter equations, super quantum groups, and Hopf algebras.

== Personal life ==
Karaali is married to mathematician Stephan Ramon Garcia. Together they have two children.
