= Ron Buckmire =

American mathematician (born 1968)

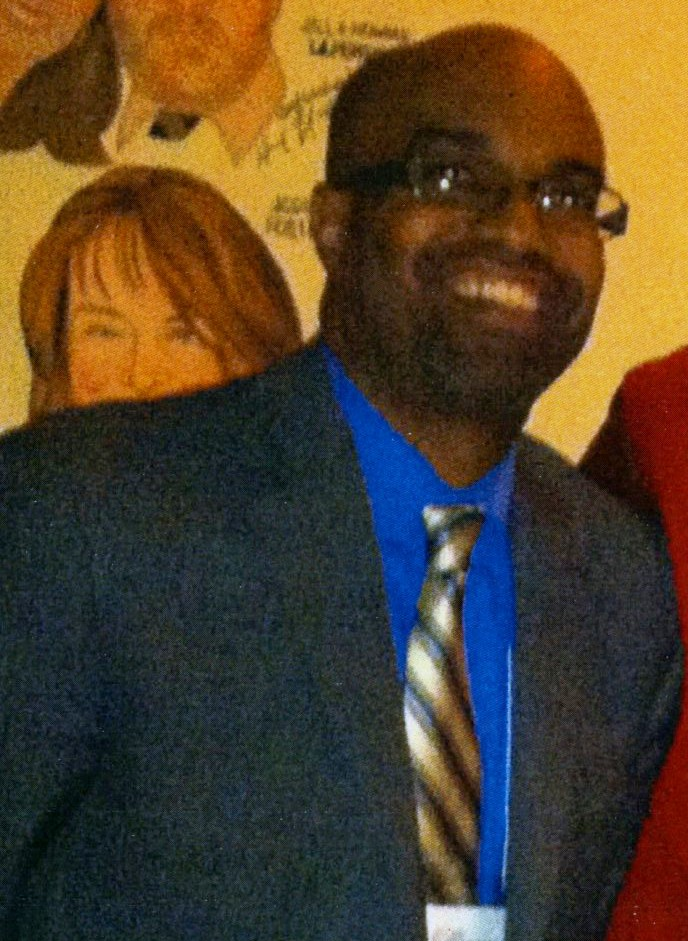
- Ron Buckmire at Joint Mathematics meeting - 2013

Personal information
- Born: May 21, 1968 (age 58) Grenville, British Grenada

Chess career
- Country: Barbados
- Title: FIDE Master (1990)
- Peak rating: 2320 (July 1996)

Academic background
- Education: Rensselaer Polytechnic Institute
- Thesis: The Design of Shock-Free Transonic Slender Bodies
- Doctoral advisor: Julian David Cole and Donald W. Schwendeman

Ron Buckmire (born 1968) is a Grenadian-born mathematician, former chess champion of Barbados and LGBT activist. He is the past chair of the Occidental College Department of Mathematics. Starting in August 2018, he served as the Associate Dean for Curricular Affairs and Director of the Core Program at Occidental College for four years. In March 2024, he was named Dean of the School of Computer Science and Mathematics at Marist University in Poughkeepsie, New York.

== Early life and education ==
Buckmire was born in 1968 in Grenville, Grenada. In 1969 his family moved to the United States while his father earned a Ph.D. degree at the University of Massachusetts at Amherst, and in 1978 they moved to Barbados. There Buckmire attended high school at the Combermere School. Buckmire returned to the United States in 1986 to attend the Rensselaer Polytechnic Institute (RPI), graduating with a B.S. degree in three years and earning his Ph.D. in 1994, both in mathematics. His dissertation was on transonic aerodynamic flow, titled "The Design of Shock-Free Transonic Slender Bodies", under the advisement of Julian David Cole and Donald William Schwendeman.

== Career ==
In 1994 he joined Occidental College as a postdoctoral researcher, and in 1996 he gained an appointment there as an assistant professor. After being granted tenure and promotion in 2004 he served as department chair from 2005 to 2010. His research interests include computational fluid dynamics for aerodynamics, nonstandard finite difference schemes, and the application of mathematical models to unusual phenomena such as the financial performance of movies.

From 2011 to 2013 Buckmire was a Program Director (rotator) at the National Science Foundation (NSF), in the Division of Undergraduate Education. After returning to Occidental he was promoted to Full Professor in 2014 and served as interim department chair for three semesters starting in Fall 2015. In summer 2016 he returned to NSF as Lead Program Director, a position he held until 2018. Starting in 2021, he is serving as SIAM's first Vice President for Equity, Diversity, and Inclusion. His term as Associate Dean for Curricular Affairs and Director of the Core Program at Occidental College ended in August 2022. In August 2024, Buckmire began serving as Dean of the School of Computer Science and Mathematics at Marist College. Marist College was renamed Marist University on January 29, 2025.

== Research ==
Buckmire's research is in the area of applied mathematics, particularly investigating numerical solutions of ordinary differential equations and partial differential equations. He has published multiple papers that show how to use nonstandard finite difference schemes to produce approximations to solutions of the Liouville–Bratu–Gelfand equation in one-dimension and in cylindrical or spherical coordinates.

== Activism ==
Buckmire is also known as an LGBT activist. He came out during college in 1988 or 1989, having gained information about homosexuality through the early Internet. He became active in several student organizations at RPI, including serving as president of the Rensselaer Gay/Lesbian/Bisexual Association and even co-founding the Women Students Association. In 1991 he began the Queer Resources Directory, an online resource that for information on issues relating to sexual minorities, and in the 1990s administered several queer electronic mailing lists/discussion groups. He was also active in outreach through radio, co-creating a queer local radio show called Homo Radio while at RPI, and later becoming a contributor to This Way Out, a national radio newsmagazine show. He organized a mailing list associated with LGBT meetups at the Joint Mathematics Meetings; this group of people evolved into Spectra.

== Awards and recognition ==
Buckmire was awarded the NOGLSTP GLBTA Educator of the Year for 2011. Buckmire was also recognized by Mathematically Gifted & Black as a Black History Month 2018 Honoree. He was elected to the 2023 Class of SIAM Fellows.

== Personal life ==
From his youth, Buckmire participated in competitive chess, becoming Barbados Junior Champion four times and National Champion three times, and as of 1997 was ranked as a senior master and one of the top 250 chess players in the United States.

Buckmire is married to Dean Elzinga, a former professional opera singer who is now a data scientist at IBM Research.
