= Conner–Floyd orientation =

In the theory of spectra and generalized (co)homology theory in mathematics, the Conner–Floyd orientations (short CF orientations) are special spectrum morphisms. One is $\operatorname{MU}\rightarrow\operatorname{KU}$ from the unitary Thom spectrum into complex/unitary K-theory, hence a complex orientation of $\operatorname{KU}$, and the other is $\operatorname{MSU}\rightarrow\operatorname{KO}$ from the special unitary Thom spectrum into real/orthogonal K-theory. The CF orientations are named after Pierre Conner and Edwin Floyd, who described it in 1966. It laid the basics for the later generalization by the Landweber exact functor theorem.

== Properties ==
- The CF orientations are compatible with the canonical spectrum morphisms $\operatorname{MSU}\rightarrow\operatorname{MU}$ and $\operatorname{KO}\rightarrow\operatorname{KU}$, hence form a commutative square with them.
- The CF orientation $\operatorname{MU}\rightarrow\operatorname{KU}$ induces an equivalence:
  $$\operatorname{MU}_*(-)\otimes_{\operatorname{MU}_*}\operatorname{KU}_*
\simeq\operatorname{KU}_*(-).$$
- The CF orientation $\operatorname{MSU}\rightarrow\operatorname{KO}$ does not induce an equivalence:
  $$\operatorname{MSU}_*(-)\otimes_{\operatorname{MSU}_*}\operatorname{KO}_*
\simeq\operatorname{KO}_*(-).$$

In 1987, Serge Ochanine described this failure and that it can be saved with various modifications. One possibility is instead using a special spectrum morphism $\operatorname{MSp}\rightarrow\operatorname{KO}$ from the symplectic Thom spectrum:

$$\operatorname{MSp}_*(-)\otimes_{\operatorname{MSp}_*}\operatorname{KO}_*
\simeq\operatorname{KO}_*(-).$$

== See also ==
- Atiyah–Bott–Shapiro orientations $\operatorname{MSpin}\rightarrow\operatorname{KO}$ and $\operatorname{MSpin}^\mathrm{c}\rightarrow\operatorname{KU}$
- Ando–Hopkins–Rezk orientation $\operatorname{MString}\rightarrow\operatorname{tmf}$

== Literature ==
- Pierre Conner, Pierre; Floyd, Edwin Floyd (1966). "Chapter 5". The Relation of Cobordism to K-Theories. Lecture Notes in Mathematics. Vol. 28. doi:10.1007/BFb0071091. eISSN 1617-9692. ISBN 978-3-540-03610-4. ISSN 0075-8434.
- Hopkins, Michael; Hovey, Mark Hovey (1995). "Spin Cobordism Determines Real K-Theory" (PDF).
