= Lily Khadjavi =

American mathematician

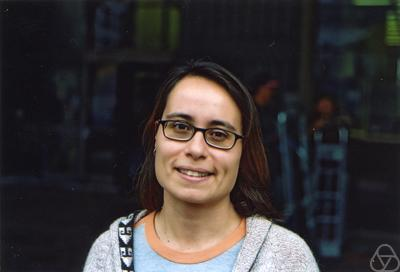
- Khadjavi in Berkeley in 2006
- Education: University of California, Berkeley
- Scientific career
- Fields: Mathematics
- Workplaces: Loyola Marymount University
- Doctoral advisors: Hendrik Lenstra

Lily Signe Khadjavi, professor of mathematics at Loyola Marymount University, is an American mathematician known for her work on the mathematics of social justice.

== Education ==
Khadjavi earned a PhD from the University of California, Berkeley in 1999. Her dissertation, in number theory, was titled An Effective Version Of Belyi's Theorem and her doctoral advisor was Hendrik Lenstra.

== Books ==
Khadjavi and Gizem Karaali have co-edited two books, Mathematics for Social Justice: Resources for the College Classroom and Mathematics for Social Justice: Focusing on Quantitative Reasoning and Statistics, which provide resources for mathematics instructors who want to add social justice topics to their courses or create new mathematics courses centered around social justice. The books are published by the MAA Press, an imprint of the American Mathematical Society. In a personal essay, Karaali has described taking inspiration from Khadjavi's work on racial profiling in Los Angeles-area traffic stops when teaching an interdisciplinary first-year seminar.

== Professional service ==
Khadjavi is a member of the board of Spectra, the association for LGBTQ+ mathematicians, and a member at large on the council of the American Mathematical Society. In 2020, California Attorney General Xavier Becerra appointed her to the state of California's Racial and Identity Profiling Advisory Board, which was established to address racial and identity-based profiling by law enforcement. In January of 2023, Khadjavi received the Mary and Alfie Gray Award for Social Justice, presented by the Association of Women in Mathematics (AWM).

Khadjavi has presented her work as popular science and in context of social issues.
