= Mike Hill (mathematician) =

American mathematician

Michael A. Hill
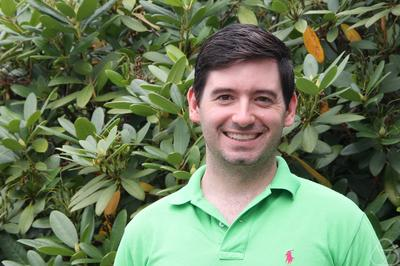
- The mathematician Michael A. "Mike" Hill at Oberwolfach in 2014
- Education: Massachusetts Institute of Technology
- Known for: Kervaire invariant problem
- Awards: Veblen Prize (2022)
- Scientific career
- Fields: Mathematics
- Workplaces: University of Minnesota; University of California, Los Angeles; University of Virginia
- Doctoral advisors: Michael J. Hopkins
- Website: https://mikehill.math.umn.edu/

Michael Anthony "Mike" Hill is an American mathematician known for his research in topology. He is a professor at the University of Minnesota. Together with Michael J. Hopkins and Douglas Ravenel, he received the American Mathematical Society's Oswald Veblen Prize in Geometry in 2022 for the paper "On the nonexistence of elements of Kervaire invariant one."

== Education ==
Hill's undergraduate degree is from Harvard University. He earned a PhD in mathematics from the Massachusetts Institute of Technology in 2006. His doctoral advisor was Michael J. Hopkins. His dissertation, in algebraic topology, was titled "Computational Methods for Higher Real K-Theory with Applications to Tmf."

== Career and personal life ==
Hill earned tenure at the University of Virginia before moving to the University of California, Los Angeles in 2015. He moved to the University of Minnesota in 2024.

Hill is a co-founder of Spectra, an association for LGBTQ+ mathematicians. He is also a member of the Spectra board.
