= Thomas Bloom =

British mathematician

- Education: University of Oxford; University of Bristol
- Awards: Royal Society University Research Fellowship
- Scientific career
- Workplaces: University of Cambridge; University of Oxford; University of Bristol; University of Manchester
- Doctoral advisor: Trevor Wooley
- Other academic advisors: Timothy Gowers

Thomas F. Bloom is a mathematician, who is a Royal Society university research fellow at the University of Manchester. He works in arithmetic combinatorics and analytic number theory.

== Education and career ==
Thomas did his undergraduate degree in Mathematics and Philosophy at Merton College, Oxford. He then went on to do his PhD in mathematics at the University of Bristol under the supervision of Trevor Wooley. After finishing his PhD, he was a Heilbronn Research Fellow at the University of Bristol. In 2018, he became a postdoctoral research fellow at the University of Cambridge with Timothy Gowers. In 2021, he joined the University of Oxford as a Research Fellow. Then, in 2024, he moved to the University of Manchester, where he also took on a Research Fellow position.

== Research ==
In July 2020, Bloom and Sisask proved that any $A \subseteq \mathbb{N}$ such that $\sum_{n \in A} \frac{1}{n}$ diverges must contain arithmetic progressions of length 3. This is the first non-trivial case of a conjecture of Erdős postulating that any such set must in fact contain arbitrarily long arithmetic progressions.

In November 2020, in joint work with James Maynard, he improved the best-known bound for square-difference-free sets, showing that a set $A \subset \{1,...,N\}$ with no square difference has size at most $\frac{N}{(\log N)^{c\log \log\log N}}$ for some $c>0$.

In December 2021, he proved that any set $A \subset \mathbb{N}$ of positive upper density contains a finite $S \subset A$ such that $\sum_{n \in S} \frac{1}{n}=1$. This answered a question of Erdős and Graham.
