= Pierre Conner =

American mathematician (1932–2018)

Pierre Euclide Conner (27 June 1932, Houston, Texas – 3 February 2018, New Orleans, Louisiana) was an American mathematician, who worked on algebraic topology and differential topology (especially cobordism theory).

In 1955 Conner received his Ph.D. from Princeton University under Donald Spencer with thesis The Green's and Neumann's Problems for Differential Forms on Riemannian Manifolds. He was a post-doctoral fellow from 1955 to 1957 (and again in 1961–1962) at the Institute for Advanced Study. He was in the 1960s a professor at the University of Virginia, where he collaborated with his colleague Edwin E. Floyd, leading to the Conner–Floyd orientation, and then in the 1970s a professor at Louisiana State University.

In 2012 he became a fellow of the American Mathematical Society.

== Publications ==
=== Articles ===
- Conner, P. E. (1958). "A note on a theorem of Mostow". Proc. Amer. Math. Soc. 9 (3): 467–471. doi:10.1090/s0002-9939-1958-0093560-x. MR 0093560.
- with E. E. Floyd: Conner, P. E.; Floyd, E. E. (1959). "On the construction of periodic maps without fixed points". Proc. Amer. Math. Soc. 10 (3): 354–360. doi:10.1090/s0002-9939-1959-0105115-x. MR 0105115.
- with E. E. Floyd: Conner, P. E.; Floyd, E. E. (1962). "Differential periodic maps". Bull. Amer. Math. Soc. 68 (2): 76–86. doi:10.1090/s0002-9904-1962-10730-7. MR 0133834.
- Conner, P. E. (1963). "Pontrjagin numbers of maps". Bull. Amer. Math. Soc. 69 (2): 276–279. doi:10.1090/s0002-9904-1963-10954-4. MR 0145551.

=== Books ===
- with E. E. Floyd: Differentiable periodic maps, Springer, Ergebnisse der Mathematik und ihrer Grenzgebiete, 1964, 2nd edn. 1979
- with E. E. Floyd: The relation of cobordism to K-theories, Lecture Notes in Mathematics, vol. 28, 1966
- Seminar on periodic maps, Springer 1966
