= Edwin E. Floyd =

American mathematician

Edwin Earl Floyd (8 May 1924, in Eufaula, Alabama – 9 December 1990) was an American mathematician, specializing in topology (especially cobordism theory).

== Education and career ==
Floyd studied received in 1943 his bachelor's degree from the University of Alabama and in 1948 his Ph.D. from the University of Virginia under Gordon Whyburn with thesis The extension of homeomorphisms. He was in the academic year 1948–1949 an instructor at Princeton University and became in 1949 a member of the faculty of the University of Virginia, where in the 1960s he collaborated with Pierre Conner in research on cobordism theory, leading to the Conner–Floyd orientation. At the University of Virginia, he was the chair of the department of mathematics from 1966 to 1969 and since 1966 the Robert C. Taylor Professor of Mathematics. In 1974 he became the dean of the Faculty of Arts and Sciences and in 1981 the vice-president and provost of the university. In the academic years 1958/59 and 1963/64 he was a visiting scholar at the Institute for Advanced Study.

From 1960 to 1964 he was a Sloan Fellow. In 1962 he was an invited speaker at the International Congress of Mathematicians in Stockholm and gave a talk Some connections between cobordism and transformation groups. In 1964 he was the Hedrick Lecturer of the Mathematical Association of America. In 1981 he received the Thomas Jefferson Award of the University of Virginia. His burial was in University Cemetery, Charlottesville, Virginia.

== Personal life ==
Floyd had a daughter, Sally.

== Selected publications ==
=== Articles ===
- Floyd, E. E. (1949). "A nonhomogeneous minimal set". Bull. Amer. Math. Soc. 55 (10): 957–960. doi:10.1090/s0002-9904-1949-09318-7. MR 0033535.
- Floyd, E. E. (1952). "On periodic maps and the Euler characteristics of associated spaces". Trans. Amer. Math. Soc. 72 (1): 138–147. doi:10.2307/1990658. JSTOR 1990658.
- Floyd, E. E. (1955). "Real-valued mappings of spheres". Proc. Amer. Math. Soc. 6 (6): 957–959. doi:10.1090/s0002-9939-1955-0073978-9. MR 0073978.
- Floyd, E. E. (1957). "Fixed point sets of compact abelian Lie groups of transformations". Annals of Mathematics. 66 (1): 30–35. doi:10.2307/1970115. JSTOR 1970115.
- with R. W. Richardson: Floyd, E. E.; Richardson, R. W. (1959). "An action of a finite group on an 𝑛-cell without stationary points". Bull. Amer. Math. Soc. 65 (2): 73–76. doi:10.1090/s0002-9904-1959-10282-2. MR 0100848.
- with Pierre E. Conner: Conner, P. E.; Floyd, E. E. (1960). "Fixed point free involutions and equivariant maps". Bull. Amer. Math. Soc. 66 (6): 416–441. doi:10.1090/s0002-9904-1960-10492-2. hdl:2027/mdp.39015095257989. MR 0163310.
- with P. E. Conner: Conner, P. E.; Floyd, E. E. (1966). "Maps of odd period". Annals of Mathematics. 84 (2): 132–156. doi:10.2307/1970515. JSTOR 1970515.
- with P. E. Conner: Conner, P. E.; Floyd, E. E. (1959). "On the construction of periodic maps without fixed points". Proc. Amer. Math. Soc. 10 (3): 354–360. doi:10.1090/s0002-9939-1959-0105115-x. hdl:2027/mdp.39015095249366. MR 0105115.
- with P. E. Conner: Conner, P. E.; Floyd, E. E. (1962). "Differential periodic maps". Bull. Amer. Math. Soc. 68 (2): 76–86. doi:10.1090/s0002-9904-1962-10730-7. MR 0133834.
- Floyd, E. E. (1971). "Stiefel-Whitney numbers of quaternionic and related manifolds". Trans. Amer. Math. Soc. 155: 77–94. doi:10.1090/s0002-9947-1971-0273632-8. MR 0273632.

=== Books ===
- with Pierre E. Conner: Conner, P. E.; Floyd, E. E. (1964). Differentiable periodic maps. Ergebnisse der Mathematik und ihrer Grenzgebiete. Springer. doi:10.1007/978-3-662-41633-4. ISBN 978-3-662-41635-8. 2nd edn. 1979
- with P. E. Conner: Conner, P. E.; Floyd, E. E. (1966). The relation of cobordism to K-theories. Lecture Notes in Mathematics, vol. 28. Vol. 28. doi:10.1007/BFb0071091. ISBN 978-3-540-03610-4.
- with P. E. Conner: Conner, Pierre E.; Floyd, E. E. (1966). Torsion in 𝑆𝑈-bordism. No. 60. American Mathematical Society. ISBN 9780821812600.
