= Susan Tolman =

American mathematician

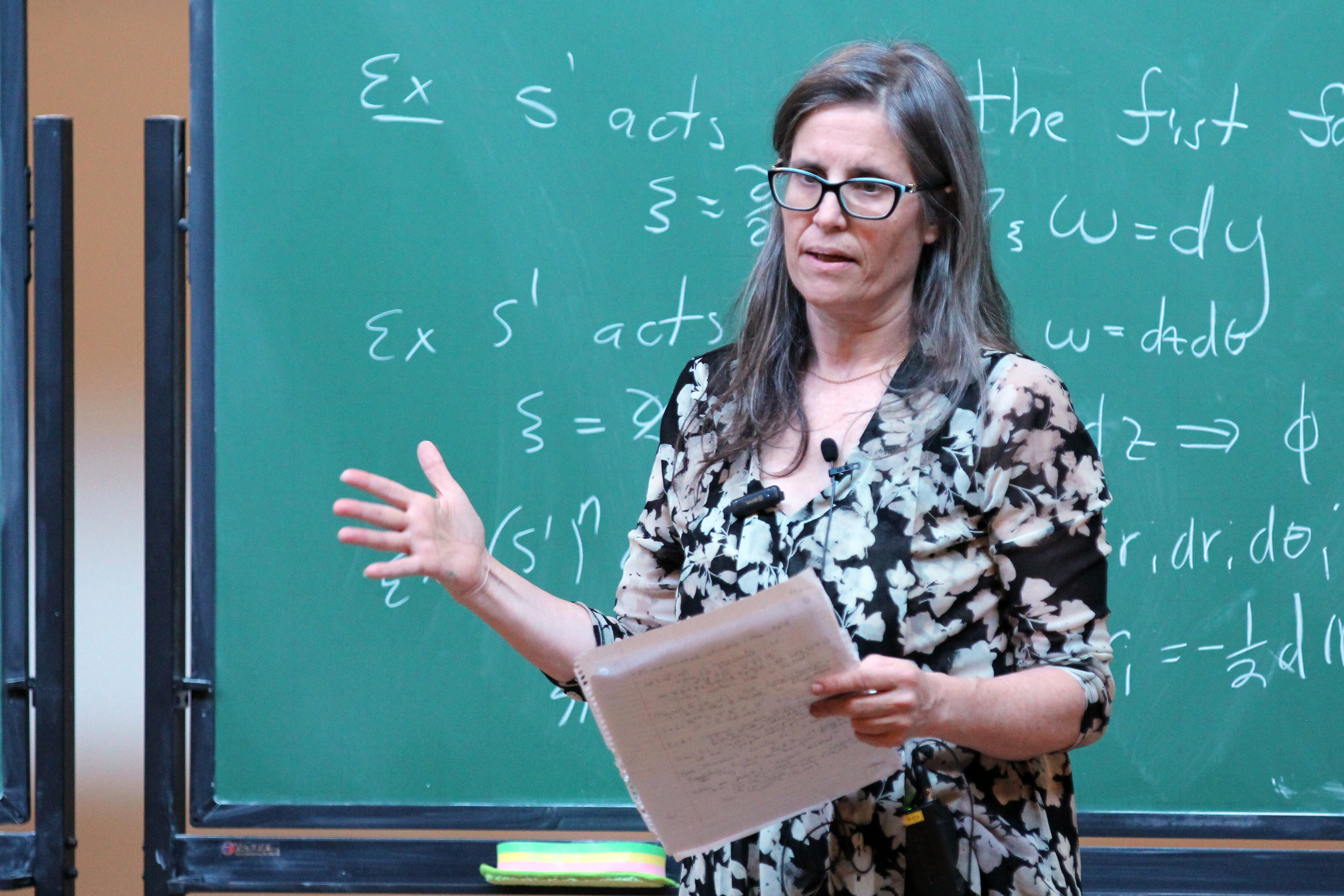

Susan Tolman is an American mathematician known for her work in symplectic geometry. She is a professor of mathematics at the University of Illinois at Urbana–Champaign, and Lynn M. Martin Professorial Scholar at Illinois.

Tolman earned her Ph.D. in 1993 at Harvard University. Her dissertation, Group Actions And Cohomology, was supervised by Raoul Bott. She was awarded a Sloan Research Fellowship in 1998, and was named Lynn M. Martin Professorial Scholar in 2008–2009.
