= Jeremy Rickard =

British mathematician

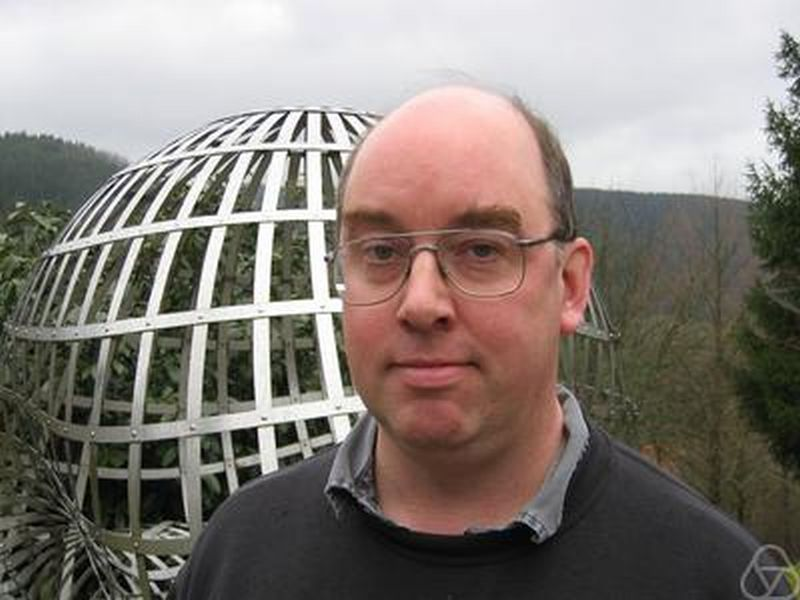
Jeremy Rickard, Oberwolfach 2006

Jeremy Rickard, also known as J. C. Rickard or J. Rickard, is a British mathematician who deals with algebra and algebraic topology. He researches modular representation theory of finite groups and related questions of algebraic topology, representation theory of finite algebras and homological algebra. Rickard or derived equivalences as a generalization of Morita equivalences of rings and algebras are named after him.

== Education and career ==
Rickard received his PhD in 1988 from University College London under Aidan Schofield. He is a professor at the University of Bristol.

== Recognition ==
Rickard was a winner of the Whitehead Prize in 1995. In 2002, he received the Senior Berwick Prize. In 1998, he was an Invited Speaker with talk The abelian defect group conjecture at the International Congress of Mathematicians in Berlin.

== Selected publications ==
- Rickard, Jeremy (1989). "Derived categories and stable equivalence". Journal of Pure and Applied Algebra. 61 (3): 303–317. doi:10.1016/0022-4049(89)90081-9. MR 1027750.
- Rickard, Jeremy (1991). "Derived equivalences as derived functors". Journal of the London Mathematical Society. Second Series. 43 (1): 37–48. doi:10.1112/jlms/s2-43.1.37. MR 1099084.
- Rickard, Jeremy (1997). "Idempotent modules in the stable category". Journal of the London Mathematical Society. Second Series. 56 (1): 149–170. doi:10.1112/S0024610797005309. MR 1462832.
- Rickard, Jeremy (1996). "Splendid equivalences: derived categories and permutation modules". Proceedings of the London Mathematical Society. Third Series. 72 (2): 331–358. doi:10.1112/plms/s3-72.2.331. MR 1367082.
- Rickard, Jeremy (1998). "The abelian defect group conjecture". Proceedings of the International Congress of Mathematicians, Vol. II (Berlin, 1998). Documenta Mathematica (Extra Vol. II): 121–128. MR 1648062.
