= Kevin Costello =

Irish mathematician

Kevin Costello FRS
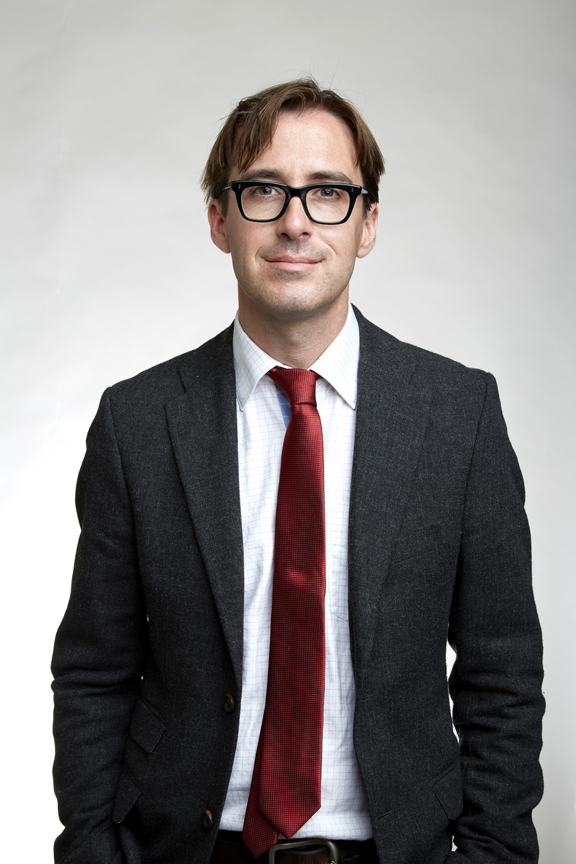
- Costello in 2018
- Born: Kevin Joseph Costello; Cork, Ireland
- Education: University of Cambridge (PhD)
- Known for: Renormalization; Topological quantum field theory
- Awards: Berwick Prize (2017)
- Scientific career
- Fields: Mathematics
- Workplaces: Northwestern University; Perimeter Institute
- Thesis: Gromov–Witten invariants and symmetric products (2003)
- Doctoral advisor: Ian Grojnowski
- Website: www.perimeterinstitute.ca/people/kevin-costello

Kevin Joseph Costello FRS is an Irish mathematician, since 2014 the Krembil Foundation's William Rowan Hamilton chair of theoretical physics at the Perimeter Institute in Waterloo, Ontario, Canada.

== Education ==
Costello was educated at the University of Cambridge where he was awarded a PhD in 2003 for research on Gromov–Witten invariants supervised by Ian Grojnowski.

== Career and research ==
Costello works in the field of mathematical physics, particularly in the mathematical foundations of perturbative quantum field theory and the applications of topological and conformal field theories to other areas of mathematics. In the book Renormalization and Effective Field Theory he introduced a rigorous mathematical formalism for the renormalization group flow formalism of Kenneth Wilson and proved the renormalizability of Yang–Mills theory in this framework.

More recent work on formalism for quantum field theory uses the idea of a factorization algebra to describe the local structure of quantum observables, such as the operator product expansion for conformal field theories. Using this language, Costello gave a rigorous construction of the Witten genus in elliptic cohomology, using a variant of Chern–Simons theory. Along with Davide Gaiotto, Kevin Costello was one of two researchers appointed to named chairs by the Perimeter Institute in 2014, funded by a $4 million investment by the Krembil Foundation. Costello's appointment was praised by Fields Medal recipients Maxim Kontsevich and Edward Witten.

=== Publications ===
- Kevin Costello and Owen Gwilliam, Factorization Algebras in Quantum Field Theory: volume 1, Cambridge University Press, 2017 ISBN 1-107-16310-2
- Kevin Costello and Owen Gwilliam, Factorization Algebras in Quantum Field Theory: volume 2, Cambridge University Press, 2021 ISBN 1-107-16315-3
- Kevin Costello, Renormalization and Effective Field Theory, Mathematical Surveys and Monographs 170, American Mathematical Society, 2022 ISBN 978-1-4704-7008-1

=== Awards and honours ===
Costello was elected a Fellow of the Royal Society (FRS) in 2018. He was awarded the Berwick Prize by the London Mathematical Society in 2017. In 2020 he was admitted as an honorary member of the Royal Irish Academy.
