= Atiyah–Bott–Shapiro orientation =

In the theory of spectra and generalized (co)homology theory in mathematics, the Atiyah–Bott–Shapiro orientations (short ABS orientations) are special spectrum morphisms. One is $\operatorname{MSpin}\rightarrow\operatorname{KO}$ from the spin spectrum into real/orthogonal K-theory and the other is $\operatorname{MSpin}^\mathrm{c}\rightarrow\operatorname{KU}$ from the spinᶜ spectrum into complex/unitary K-theory. These represent the Â genus and the Todd genus. The ABS orientations are named after Michael Atiyah, Raoul Bott und Arnold Shapiro, who introduced it in 1963.

== Properties ==
- The ABS orientations are compatible with the canonical spectrum morphisms $\operatorname{MSpin}\rightarrow\operatorname{MSpin}^\mathrm{c}$ and $\operatorname{KO}\rightarrow\operatorname{KU}$, hence form a commutative square with them.
- The ABS orientation $\operatorname{MSpin}\rightarrow\operatorname{KO}$ induces an equivalence:
  $$\operatorname{MSpin}_*(-)\otimes_{\operatorname{MSpin}_*}\operatorname{KO}_*
\simeq\operatorname{KO}_*(-).$$
- The ABS orientation $\operatorname{MSpin}^\mathrm{c}\rightarrow\operatorname{KU}$ induces an equivalence:
  $$\operatorname{MSpin}_*^\mathrm{c}(-)\otimes_{\operatorname{MSpin}_*^\mathrm{c}}\operatorname{KU}_*
\simeq\operatorname{KU}_*(-).$$
- The ABS orientation $\operatorname{MSpin}\rightarrow\operatorname{bo}$ is surjective on homotopy groups, hence induces surjections $\pi_*\operatorname{MSpin}\rightarrow\pi_*\operatorname{bo}$.

== See also ==
- Conner–Floyd orientations $\operatorname{MU}\rightarrow\operatorname{KU}$ and $\operatorname{MSU}\rightarrow\operatorname{KO}$
- Ando–Hopkins–Rezk orientation $\operatorname{MString}\rightarrow\operatorname{tmf}$

== Literature ==
- Atiyah, Michael; Bott, Raoul; Shapiro, Arnold (1963). "Clifford modules". Topology. 3 (1): 3–38. doi:10.1016/0040-9383(64)90003-5.
- Hopkins, Michael; Hovey, Mark Hovey (1995). "Spin Cobordism Determines Real K-Theory" (PDF).
- Joachim, Michael (2004). "Higher coherences for equivariant K-theory". London Math. Soc. Lecture Note Ser. 315. Cambridge University Press. doi:10.1016/0040-9383(64)90003-5.
