= Ando–Hopkins–Rezk orientation =

In the theory of spectra and generalized (co)homology theory in mathematics, the Ando–Hopkins–Rezk orientation (short AHR orientation) is a special spectrum morphism $\operatorname{MString}\rightarrow\operatorname{tmf}$ from the string spectrum to that of topological modular forms (tmf). It represents the Witten genus. The AHR orientation is named after Matthew Ando, Michael Hopkins and Charles Rezk, who described it in 2010 based on previous work by Michael Hopkins and Neil Strickland.

== Properties ==
- The AHR orientation $\operatorname{MString}\rightarrow\operatorname{tmf}$ is surjective on homotopy groups, hence induces surjections $\pi_*\operatorname{MString}\rightarrow\pi_*\operatorname{tmf}$.

== See also ==
- Conner–Floyd orientations $\operatorname{MU}\rightarrow\operatorname{KU}$ and $\operatorname{MSU}\rightarrow\operatorname{KO}$
- Atiyah–Bott–Shapiro orientations $\operatorname{MSpin}\rightarrow\operatorname{KO}$ and $\operatorname{MSpin}^\mathrm{c}\rightarrow\operatorname{KU}$

== Literature ==
- Hopkins, Michael (1995). "Topological Modular Forms, the Witten Genus, and the Theorem of the Cube". Proceedings of the International Congress of Mathematicians. 1/2. Zürich/Basel: Birkhäuser: 554–565. doi:10.1007/978-3-0348-9078-6_49. ISBN 978-3-0348-9897-3.
- Ando, Matthew; Hopkins, Michael; Strickland, Neil (2001). "Elliptic spectra, the Witten genus and the theorem of the cube". Invent. Math. 146 (3): 595–687. Bibcode:2001InMat.146..595A. doi:10.1007/s002220100175.
- Hopkins, Michael (2002). "Algebraic topology and modular forms". Proceedings of the International Congress of Mathematicians. Beijing: 291–317. arXiv:math/0212397. Bibcode:2002math.....12397H.
- Ando, Matthew; Hopkins, Michael; Strickland, Neil (2004). "The sigma orientation is an H-infinity map". American Journal of Mathematics. 126. arXiv:math/0204053. doi:10.1353/ajm.2004.0008.
- Ando, Matthew; Hopkins, Michael; Rezk, Charles (2010). "Multiplicative orientations of KO-theory and the spectrum of topological modular forms" (PDF).
- Sanath Devalapurkar (2018). "The Ando-Hopkins-Rezk orientation is surjective". arXiv:1911.10534 [math.AT].
