= Emmanuel Breuillard =

French mathematician (born 1977)

- Born: 25 June 1977 (age 49); Poitiers, France
- Education: École Normale Supérieure; University of Cambridge; Yale University
- Awards: EMS Prize (2012); Fellow of the Royal Society (2024); Fröhlich Prize (2024)
- Scientific career
- Fields: Mathematics
- Workplaces: Paris-Sud 11 University; University of Cambridge; University of Oxford
- Doctoral advisor: Grigory Margulis

Emmanuel F. Breuillard FRS (born 25 June 1977) is a French mathematician. He was the Sadleirian Professor of Pure Mathematics in the Department of Pure Mathematics and Mathematical Statistics (DPMMS) at the University of Cambridge, and is now Professor of Pure Mathematics at the Mathematical Institute, University of Oxford as of January 1, 2022. He had previously been professor at Paris-Sud 11 University.

In 2012, he won an EMS Prize for his contributions to combinatorics and other fields. His area of research has been in group theoretic aspects of geometry, number theory and combinatorics. In 2014 he was an invited speaker at the International Congress of Mathematicians in Seoul. He was elected a member of the Academia Europaea in 2021 and a Fellow of the Royal Society in 2024. In 2024–25, he was the first holder of the Jacques Tits Chair founded by the Belgian Mathematical Society.
