= Fröhlich Prize =

- Awarded for: Original and extremely innovative work in any branch of mathematics.
- Location: London, UK
- Country: United Kingdom
- Presented by: London Mathematical Society (LMS)
- Eligibility: Mathematicians who, on 1 January of the award year, have fewer than 25 years (full-time equivalent) of post-doctoral involvement in mathematics.
- Status: Active
- Established: 2002
- Website: www.lms.ac.uk/prizes/lms-prizes

The Fröhlich Prize of the London Mathematical Society is awarded in even numbered years in memory of Albrecht Fröhlich. The prize is awarded for original and extremely innovative work in any branch of mathematics. According to the regulations the prize is awarded "to a mathematician who has fewer than 25 years (full time equivalent) of involvement in mathematics at post-doctoral level, allowing for breaks in continuity, or who in the opinion of the Prizes Committee is at an equivalent stage in their career."

The prize fund was established by a generous donation from Mrs. Fröhlich.

== Prize winners ==
Source: LMS website

- 2004 Ian Grojnowski
- 2006 Michael Weiss
- 2008 Nicholas Higham
- 2010 Jonathan Keating
- 2012 Trevor Wooley
- 2014 Martin Hairer
- 2016 Dominic Joyce
- 2018 Francesco Mezzadri
- 2020 Françoise Tisseur
- 2022 Richard Thomas
- 2024 Emmanuel Breuillard

== See also ==
- Whitehead Prize
- Senior Whitehead Prize
- Shephard Prize
- Berwick Prize
- Naylor Prize and Lectureship
- Pólya Prize (LMS)
- De Morgan Medal
- List of mathematics awards
