= Spectra (mathematical association) =

Professional association of LGBT mathematicians

Spectra: the Association for LGBT Mathematicians
- Established: 2015 (11 years ago)
- Chairpersons: Mike Hill
- Website: www.lgbtmath.org

Spectra is a professional association of LGBTQIA+ mathematicians. It arose from a need for recognition and community for mathematicians who belong to gender and sexual minorities.

== History ==
Spectra has its roots in meetups arranged at the Joint Mathematics Meetings (JMM) and a mailing list organized by Ron Buckmire. It arose in reaction to the JMM being scheduled to occur in Denver in 1995 when the state of Colorado voters approved the anti-gay 1992 Colorado Amendment 2. In December 1992 David Pengelley wrote letters to members of the AMS and MAA urging them to move the meeting out of Colorado, feeling that it would be offensive to the many homosexual participants to attend a meeting in an openly hostile and potentially dangerous place. Moreover, he thought that such a decision could help ensure that similar political decisions do not become a national trend. In the same month, James Humphreys also sent a letter with a similar message. Then, in the meeting in San Antonio of January 1993, the AMS and MAA agreed to move the meeting from Denver to San Francisco.

There, at the 1995 JMM meeting, James Humphreys, Robert Bryant, and others organized a reception for LGBT mathematicians, called LGBT Math, which would become Spectra in 2015. The LGBT Math reception became an annual event, with a listserv organized by Ron Buckmire. The most popular topics of conversation involved the gay-friendly quality of one’s home institution and the fear of not being able have career advancements or even to be fired on the ground of "moral turpitude" if they would be openly gay.

The association's name was coined by Robert Bryant and Mike Hill and references the mathematical concept of a spectrum as well as the rainbow flag. After 20 years of recurrent LGBT Math meetings, the newly founded Spectra held its first official activity in 2015, a panel at the JMM of the same year.

== Board ==
Many prominent mathematicians have served on the Spectra board, including Robert Bryant, Ron Buckmire, Moon Duchin, Mike Hill, Lily Khadjavi, Doug Lind, and Emily Riehl.

== Out and Ally lists ==
Spectra maintains a list of mathematicians who are out in the LGBTQIA+ community as well as a list of allies for the community. The goal of the list is to serve as support for mathematicians at various places on their own LGBTQ+ journeys and also as a resource for people looking to learn more about the climate at various universities. Each mathematician on the list has a profile with, e.g., name, position, location, pronouns, and contact preferences. Any identity words or pronouns listed were given by the person being profiled when they completed an online form to be listed.

== Activism and engagement ==
Spectra continues to work toward increased visibility of LGBTQIA+ mathematicians, through conferences, workshops, panel discussions, and designated lectures. The association is also working with scholarly publishers around transgender mathematicians and their names in published works.

Spectra also helps to start student chapters in universities.

=== Panel discussions at the JMM ===
Spectra has been sponsoring JMM panels on issues related to LGBTQ+ members of the mathematics community, including the following:

- Out in Mathematics: LGBTQ Mathematicians in the Workplace, 2015 JMM in San Antonio, Texas;
- Out in Mathematics: Professional Issues Facing LGBTQ Mathematicians, 2018 JMM, San Diego, California;
- Spectra Town Hall Meeting: Identifying Workplace Best Practices for LGBTQ Mathematicians, 2019 JMM, Baltimore, Maryland;
- Supporting Transgender and Non-binary Students, 2020 JMM, Denver, Colorado.

=== Conferences ===
Spectra also organizes conferences, including the following:

- Spectra LGBTQ+ Mathematics Conference, annual meeting;
- Queer In Number Theory and Geometry, hosted in West Lexham, 30 August – 1 September, 2023;
- Queer and Trans in Mathematical Analysis (QuMA) Conference, hosted in a hybrid format, June 12–14, 2024;
- $\mathrm{Spec}(\bar{\mathbb Q}(2\pi i))$, hosted by The Fields Institute, June 18–21, 2024;
- Queer in Computational and Applied Mathematics (QCAM) Workshop, hosted by ICERM, June 24–28, 2024;
- LGBTQ+ in Math Alliance Conference, hosted by the Spectra student chapter at The Ohio State University, July 6–7, 2024.
