= Bott cannibalistic class =

Element of the representation ring

In mathematics, the Bott cannibalistic class, introduced by Raoul Bott (1962), is an element $\theta_k(V)$ of the representation ring of a compact Lie group that describes the action of the Adams operation $\psi^k$ on the Thom class $\lambda_V$ of a complex representation $V$. The term "cannibalistic" for these classes was introduced by Frank Adams.
