= Berwick Prize =

Award

- Country: United Kingdom
- Presented by: London Mathematical Society (LMS)
- Eligibility: Author(s) of a paper published in an LMS journal in the preceding 8 years.
- Established: 1947 (as the Junior Berwick Prize); renamed Berwick Prize in 2001
- Website: www.lms.ac.uk/prizes/berwick-prize

Senior Berwick Prize
- Country: United Kingdom
- Presented by: London Mathematical Society (LMS)
- Eligibility: Author(s) of a paper published in an LMS journal in the preceding 8 years.
- Established: 1946 (First awarded in 1949)
- Website: www.lms.ac.uk/prizes/senior-berwick-prize

The Berwick Prize and Senior Berwick Prize are two prizes of the London Mathematical Society awarded in alternating years in memory of William Edward Hodgson Berwick, a previous Vice-President of the LMS. Berwick left some money to be given to the society to establish two prizes. His widow Daisy May Berwick gave the society the money and the society established the prizes, with the first Senior Berwick Prize being presented in 1946 and the first Junior Berwick Prize the following year. The prizes are awarded "in recognition of an outstanding piece of mathematical research ... published by the Society" in the eight years before the year of the award.

The Berwick Prize was known as the Junior Berwick Prize up to 1999, and was given its current name for the 2001 award.

The Berwick Prize is awarded biennially (every two years) in odd-numbered years, and the Junior Berwick Prize is awarded in even-numbered years.

== Senior Berwick Prize winners ==
- 1946 Louis Mordell
- 1948 J H C Whitehead
- 1950 Kurt Mahler
- 1952 William V D Hodge
- 1954 Harold Davenport
- 1956 Edward Charles Titchmarsh
- 1958 Philip Hall
- 1960 John Edensor Littlewood
- 1962 Graham Higman
- 1964 Walter Hayman
- 1966 F F Bonsall
- 1968 George Leo Watson
- 1970 Alfred Goldie
- 1972 Richard Rado
- 1974 Paul Cohn
- 1976 Albrecht Fröhlich
- 1978 E. M. Wright
- 1980 Christopher Hooley
- 1982 John G Thompson
- 1984 James Alexander Green
- 1986 G Peter Scott
- 1988 David B A Epstein
- 1990 Nigel Hitchin
- 1992 James Eells
- 1994 Andrew A Ranicki
- 1996 Roger Heath-Brown
- 1998 E B Davies
- 2000 John Toland
- 2002 Jeremy C Rickard
- 2004 Boris Zilber
- 2006 Miles Reid
- 2008 Kevin Buzzard
- 2010 Dusa McDuff
- 2012 Ian Agol
- 2014 Daniel Freed, Michael Hopkins & Constantin Teleman
- 2016 Keisuke Hara, Masanori Hino
- 2018 Marc Levine
- 2020 Thomas Hales
- 2022 John Greenlees & Brooke Shipley
- 2024 Christopher J. Bishop

== Berwick Prize winners ==
- 1947 Arthur Geoffrey Walker
- 1949 Lionel Cooper
- 1951 David Bernard Scott
- 1953 Douglas Northcott
- 1955 Walter Hayman
- 1957 Claude Ambrose Rogers
- 1959 I M James
- 1961 Michael Atiyah
- 1963 Frank Adams
- 1965 C T C Wall
- 1967 John Kingman
- 1969 Graham Robert Allan
- 1971 John Horton Conway
- 1973 D G Larman
- 1975 R G Haydon
- 1977 George Lusztig
- 1979 Bob Vaughan
- 1981 Roger Heath-Brown
- 1983 D H Hamilton
- 1985 C J Read
- 1987 P A Linnell
- 1989 G R Robinson
- 1991 W W Crawley-Boevey
- 1993 Trevor Wooley
- 1995 J P C Greenlees
- 1997 Dugald Macpherson
- 1999 D Burns
- 2001 Marcus du Sautoy
- 2003 Tom Bridgeland
- 2005 Iain Gordon
- 2007 No award
- 2009 Joseph Chuang and Radha Kessar
- 2011 No award
- 2013 No award
- 2015 Pierre-Emmanuel Caprace, Nicolas Monod
- 2017 Kevin Costello
- 2019 Clark Barwick
- 2021 Ailsa Keating
- 2023 Jian Ding and Ewain Gwynne
- 2025 Adrien Brochier and David Jordan

== See also ==
- Whitehead Prize
- Senior Whitehead Prize
- Shephard Prize
- Fröhlich Prize
- Naylor Prize and Lectureship
- Pólya Prize (LMS)
- De Morgan Medal
- List of mathematics awards.
