= Edward B. Curtis =

American mathematician (1933–2024)

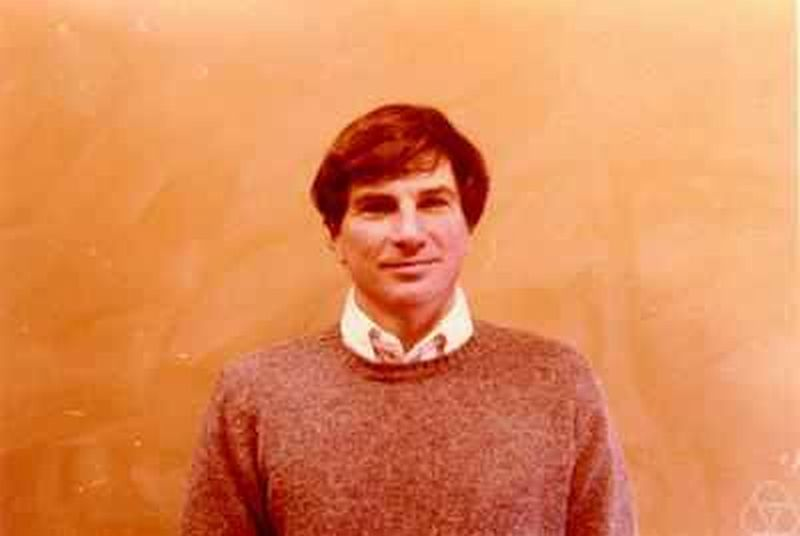
Edward B. Curtis, Seattle 1978

Edward Baldwin Curtis (March 13, 1933 – April 2, 2024) was an American mathematician.

== Life and career ==
Curtis was born in Newburyport, Massachusetts on March 13, 1933. He received his bachelor's degree from Harvard University in 1954. After graduate study from 1958 to 1959 at the University of Oxford, he returned to Harvard and earned a Ph.D. there in 1962. His thesis The Lower Central Series for Free Group Complexes was supervised by Raoul Bott. Curtis became an instructor at the Massachusetts Institute of Technology (1962–1964), assistant professor (1964–1967), and associate professor (1967–1970). In 1970 he became a professor at the University of Washington in Seattle, where he remained until his retirement as professor emeritus.

His research interests included graph theory and flow networks. In 1967 for his studies on algebraic topology he received a Guggenheim Fellowship and in 1972 the Leroy P. Steele Prize for his paper Simplicial homotopy theory.

Curtis died in Seattle, Washington on April 2, 2024, at the age of 91.

== Works ==
- The Lower Central Series for Free Group Complexes. Thesis (Ph.D.). Harvard University. 1962.
- Curtis, Edward B. (1971). "Simplicial homotopy theory". Advances in Mathematics. 6 (2): 107–209. doi:10.1016/0001-8708(71)90015-6. MR 0279808.
- with James A. Morrow: Inverse problems for electrical networks. Series on applied mathematics. Vol. 13. Singapore: World Scientific. 2000. ISBN 981-02-4174-7.

== Sources ==
- Mary Ellis Woodring and Susan Park Norton (eds.): Reports of the President and the Treasurer [of the John Simon Guggenheim Memorial Foundation] 1967 and 1968. New York 1967, ISSN 0190-227X, p. 27 (excerpt)
