= Trevor Wooley =

British mathematician

Trevor D. Wooley
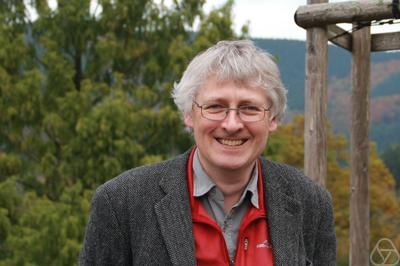
- Trevor D. Wooley
- Education: Gonville and Caius College, Cambridge (BA, MA); Imperial College London (PhD)
- Known for: Waring's problem
- Awards: Berwick Prize (1993); Salem Prize (1998); Fellow of the Royal Society (2007); Fröhlich Prize (2012)
- Scientific career
- Fields: Mathematician
- Workplaces: University of Michigan; University of Bristol; Purdue University
- Thesis: On Simultaneous Additive Equations and Waring's Problem (1990)
- Doctoral advisor: Bob Vaughan
- Doctoral students: Thomas Bloom

Trevor Dion Wooley is a British mathematician, the Andris A. Zoltners Distinguished Professor of Mathematics at Purdue University. His fields of interest include analytic number theory, Diophantine equations and Diophantine problems, harmonic analysis, the Hardy-Littlewood circle method, and the theory and applications of exponential sums. He has made significant breakthroughs on Waring's problem, for which he was awarded the Salem Prize in 1998.

== Education and career ==
Wooley read mathematics in Gonville and Caius College, Cambridge, receiving a bachelor's degree from the University of Cambridge in 1987 with first class honours, and a master's degree in 1991. Meanwhile, he completed his PhD, supervised by Bob Vaughan, in 1990 from Imperial College London.

After postdoctoral research in the Institute for Advanced Study in Princeton, New Jersey, he became an assistant professor of mathematics at the University of Michigan in 1991. He was promoted to associate professor in 1995, and full professor in 1998; he chaired the mathematics department from 2002 to 2005.

In 2007 he returned to the UK as a professor of pure mathematics at the University of Bristol, where he became head of pure mathematics from 2015 to 2016. At Bristol, his doctoral students included Thomas Bloom. He took his current position as Andris A. Zoltners Distinguished Professor of Mathematics at Purdue University in 2019.

== Awards and honours ==
Wooley was the recipient of the 1993 Berwick Prize of the London Mathematical Society. He was awarded the 1998 Salem Prize "for his work in additive number theory, in particular on problems of Waring's type". He was an invited speaker at the International Congress of Mathematicians (ICM), held in Beijing in 2002, and after receiving the 2012 Fröhlich Prize he spoke again at the 2014 ICM in Seoul.

He was elected as a Fellow of the Royal Society (FRS) in 2007, and as a Fellow of the American Mathematical Society in 2012.

== Selected publications ==
- Wooley, Trevor D. (1992). "Large improvements in Waring's problem". The Annals of Mathematics. 135 (1): 131–164. doi:10.2307/2946566. JSTOR 2946566. MR 1147960. Zbl 0754.11026.
- Wooley, Trevor D. (1994). "Quasi-diagonal behaviour in certain mean value theorems of additive number theory". Journal of the American Mathematical Society. 7 (1): 221–245. doi:10.1090/s0894-0347-1994-1224595-9. MR 1224595. Zbl 0786.11053.
- Wooley, Trevor D. (1995). "Breaking classical convexity in Waring's problem: Sums of cubes and quasi-diagonal behaviour". Inventiones Mathematicae. 122 (1): 421–451. Bibcode:1995InMat.122..421W. doi:10.1007/bf01231451. hdl:2027.42/46588. MR 1359599. Zbl 0851.11055.
- Wooley, Trevor (1 May 2012). "Vinogradov's mean value theorem via efficient congruencing". Annals of Mathematics. 175 (3): 1575–1627. arXiv:1101.0574. doi:10.4007/annals.2012.175.3.12. MR 2912712. S2CID 13286053. Zbl 1267.11105.
