= Print Gallery (M. C. Escher) =

Lithograph printed in 1956 by the Dutch artist M. C. Escher

- Prentententoonstelling (Dutch)
- A man viewing a print of a seaport in a gallery, with the gallery itself appearing within the print
- Artist: M. C. Escher
- Year: 1956
- Type: Lithograph
- Dimensions: 12.625 in × 12.5 in (32.07 cm × 31.75 cm)

Print Gallery (Dutch: Prentententoonstelling) is a lithograph printed in 1956 by the Dutch artist M. C. Escher. It depicts a man in a gallery viewing a print of a seaport, and among the buildings in the seaport is the very gallery in which he is standing, making use of the Droste effect with visual recursion. The lithograph has attracted discussion in both mathematical and artistic contexts. Escher considered Print Gallery to be among the best of his works.

== Origins ==
Bruno Ernst cites Escher as stating that he began Print Gallery "from the idea that it must be possible to make an annular bulge, a cyclic expansion ... without beginning or end." Escher attempted to do this with straight lines, but intuitively switched to using curved lines which make the grid expand greatly as it rotates.

== Seeming paradox ==
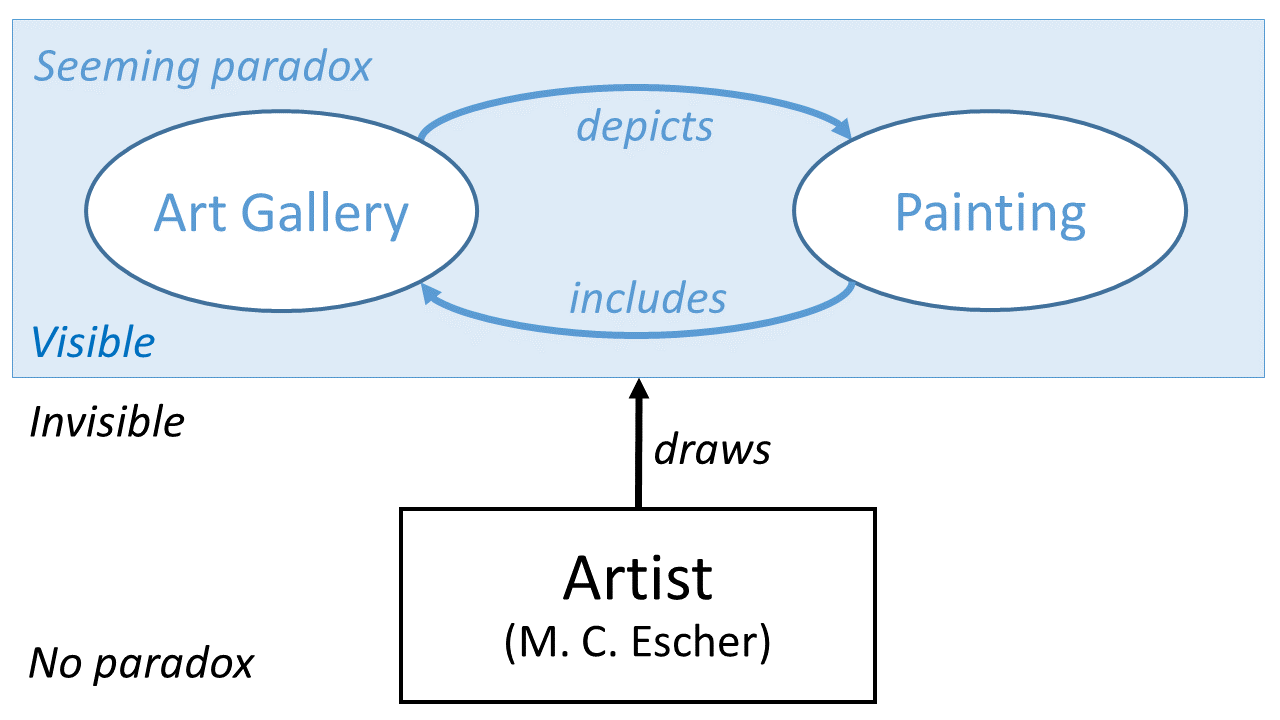
Diagram of the apparent paradox embodied in M. C. Escher's 1956 lithograph Print Gallery, as discussed by Douglas Hofstadter in his 1980 book Gödel, Escher, Bach

In his book Gödel, Escher, Bach, Douglas Hofstadter explains the seeming paradox embodied in Print Gallery as a strange loop showing three kinds of "in-ness": the gallery is physically in the town ("inclusion"); the town is artistically in the picture ("depiction"); the picture is mentally in the person ("representation").

== Possible Droste effect ==
Escher's signature is on a circular void in the centre of the work. In 2003, two Dutch mathematicians, Bart de Smit and Hendrik Lenstra, reported a way of filling in the void by treating the work as drawn on an elliptic curve over the field of complex numbers. They deem an idealised version of Print Gallery to contain a copy of itself (the Droste effect), rotated clockwise by about 157.63 degrees and shrunk by a factor of about 22.58. Their website further explores the mathematical structure of the picture.

== Architectural influences ==
The seaport in the print is Senglea, Malta, which Escher had depicted in a 1935 colour woodcut.
