= Charles Rezk =

American mathematician

Charles Waldo Rezk (born 26 January 1969) is an American mathematician, specializing in algebraic topology and category theory.

== Education and career ==
Rezk matriculated at the University of Pennsylvania in 1987 and graduated there in 1991 with B.A. and M.A. in mathematics. In 1996 he received his PhD from MIT with thesis Spaces of Algebra Structures and Cohomology of Operads and advisor Michael J. Hopkins. At Northwestern University Rezk was a faculty member from 1996 to 2001. At the University of Illinois he was an assistant professor from 2001 to 2006 and an associate professor from 2006 to 2014, and has been a full professor since 2014.

He was at the Institute for Advanced Study in the fall of 1999, the spring of 2000, and the spring of 2001. He held visiting positions at MIT in 2006 and at Berkeley's MSRI in 2014. Since 2015 he has been a member of the editorial board of Compositio Mathematica.

Rezk was an invited speaker at the International Congress of Mathematicians in Seoul in 2014. He was elected a Fellow of the American Mathematical Society in the class of 2015 (announced in late 2014).

The Ando–Hopkins–Rezk orientation is named after him.

== Selected publications ==
- Rezk, Charles (1998). "Notes on the Hopkins-Miller theorem" (PDF). Contemporary Mathematics. 220: 313–366. doi:10.1090/conm/220/03107. ISBN 9780821808054.
- Mahowald, Mark; Rezk, Charles (1999). "Brown-Comenetz duality and the Adams spectral sequence". American Journal of Mathematics. 121 (6): 1153–1177. doi:10.1353/ajm.1999.0043. S2CID 168002.
- Rezk, Charles (2001). "A model for the homotopy theory of homotopy theory". Transactions of the American Mathematical Society. 353 (3): 973–1008. arXiv:math/9811037. doi:10.1090/S0002-9947-00-02653-2.
- Rezk, Charles; Schwede, Stefan; Shipley, Brooke (2001). "Simplicial structures on model categories and functors". American Journal of Mathematics. 123 (3): 551–575. arXiv:math/0101162. Bibcode:2001math......1162R. doi:10.1353/ajm.2001.0019. S2CID 14472961.
- Goerss, Paul [in German]; Henn, Hans-Werner; Mahowald, Mark; Rezk, Charles (2005). "A resolution of the K(2)-local sphere at the prime 3". Annals of Mathematics. 162 (2): 777–822. arXiv:0706.2175. doi:10.4007/annals.2005.162.777.
- Goerss, P.; Henn, H-.W.; Mahowald, M.; Rezk, C. (2005). "A Resolution of the K(2)-Local Sphere at the Prime 3". Annals of Mathematics. 162 (2): 777–822. arXiv:0706.2175. doi:10.4007/annals.2005.162.777. JSTOR 20159929.
- Rezk, Charles (2006). "The units of a ring spectrum and a logarithmic cohomology operation". Journal of the American Mathematical Society. 19 (4): 969–1015. arXiv:math/0407022. doi:10.1090/S0894-0347-06-00521-2. ISSN 0894-0347.
- Rezk, Charles (2010). "A cartesian presentation of weak n–categories". Geometry & Topology. 14: 521–571. arXiv:0901.3602. doi:10.2140/gt.2010.14.521.
- Ando, Matthew; Rezk, Charles; Blumberg, Andrew J.; Gepner, David; Hopkins, Michael J. (2014). "An ∞-categorical approach to R-line bundles, R-module Thom spectra, and twisted R-homology". Journal of Topology. 7 (3): 869–893. arXiv:1403.4325. doi:10.1112/jtopol/jtt035. S2CID 119141389.
