= Hendrik Lenstra =

Dutch mathematician (born 1949)

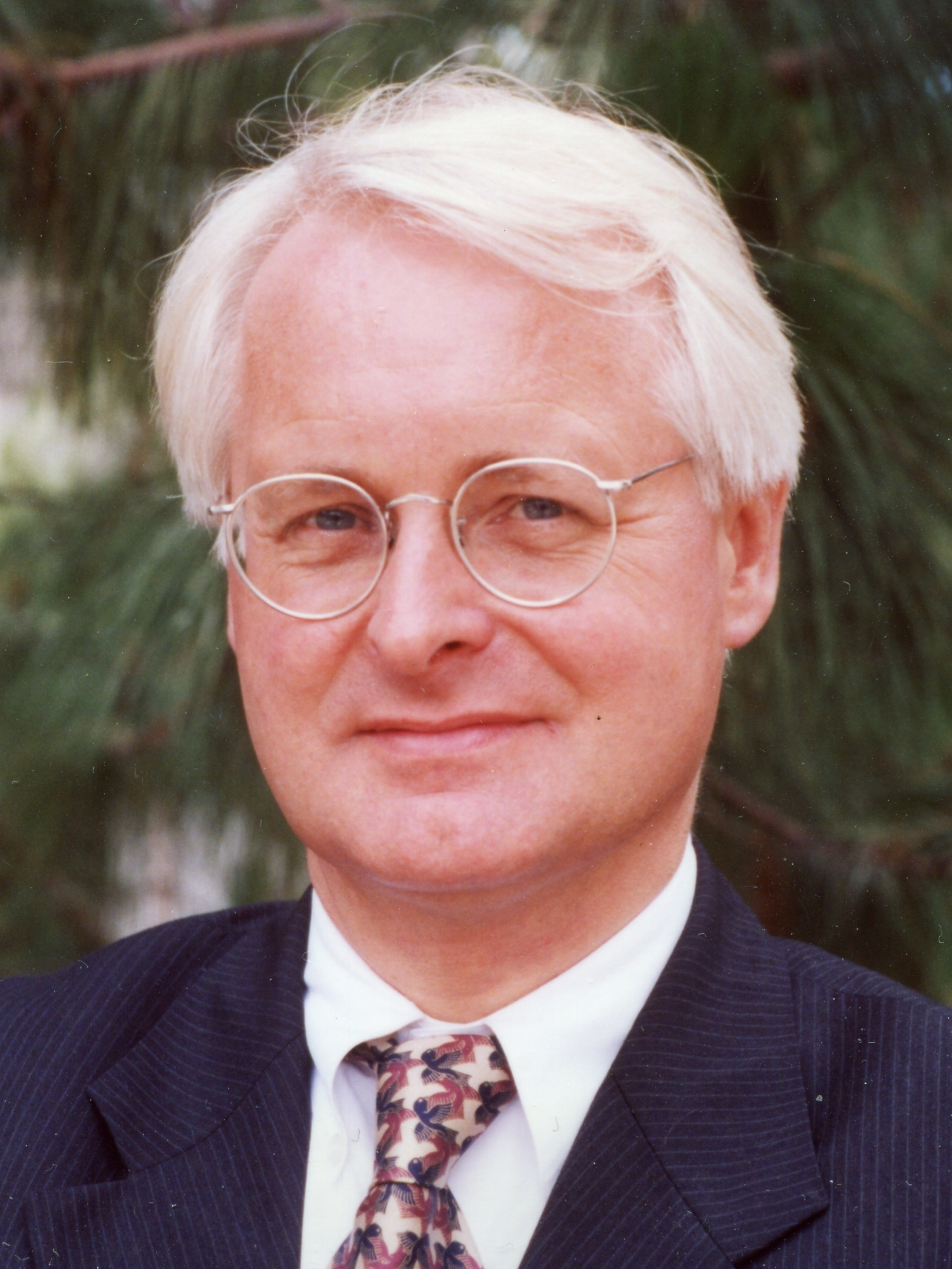
- Lenstra in Berkeley, 2001
- Born: 16 April 1949 (age 77); Zaandam, Netherlands
- Education: University of Amsterdam
- Known for: Lenstra elliptic-curve factorization Lenstra–Lenstra–Lovász lattice basis reduction algorithm Lenstra–Pomerance–Wagstaff conjecture APR-CL primality test
- Awards: Fulkerson Prize (1985); Spinoza Prize (1988); Gauss Lecture (2009); American Mathematical Society Fellow (2012)
- Scientific career
- Fields: Mathematics
- Workplaces: University of California, Berkeley; University of Leiden
- Thesis: Euclidische getallenlichamen (1977)
- Doctoral advisor: Frans Oort
- Doctoral students: René Schoof; Preda Mihăilescu; Daniel J. Bernstein; William A. Stein; Lily Khadjavi

Hendrik Willem Lenstra Jr. (born 16 April 1949, Zaandam) is a Dutch mathematician.

== Biography ==
Lenstra received his doctorate from the University of Amsterdam in 1977 and became a professor there in 1978. In 1987, he was appointed to the faculty of the University of California, Berkeley; starting in 1998, he divided his time between Berkeley and the University of Leiden, until 2003, when he retired from Berkeley to take a full-time position at Leiden.

Three of his brothers, Arjen Lenstra, Andries Lenstra, and Jan Karel Lenstra, are also mathematicians. Jan Karel Lenstra is the former director of the Netherlands Centrum Wiskunde & Informatica (CWI). Hendrik Lenstra was the Chairman of the Program Committee of the International Congress of Mathematicians in 2010.

== Scientific contributions ==
Lenstra has worked principally in computational number theory. He is well known for:

- Co-discovering of the Lenstra–Lenstra–Lovász lattice basis reduction algorithm (in 1982);
- Developing a polynomial-time algorithm for solving a feasibility integer programming problem when the number of variables is fixed (in 1983);
- Discovering the elliptic curve factorization method (in 1987);
- Computing all solutions to the inverse Fermat equation (in 1992);
- The Cohen-Lenstra heuristics — a set of precise conjectures about the structure of class groups of quadratic fields.

== Awards and honors ==
In 1984, Lenstra became a member of the Royal Netherlands Academy of Arts and Sciences. He won the Fulkerson Prize in 1985 for his research using the geometry of numbers to solve integer programs with few variables in time polynomial in the number of constraints. He was awarded the Spinoza Prize in 1998, and on 24 April 2009 he was made a Knight of the Order of the Netherlands Lion. In 2009, he was awarded a Gauss Lecture by the German Mathematical Society. In 2012, he became a fellow of the American Mathematical Society.

== Publications ==
- Euclidean Number Fields. Parts 1-3, Mathematical Intelligencer 1980
- with A. K. Lenstra: Algorithms in Number Theory. pp. 673–716, In Jan van Leeuwen (ed.): Handbook of Theoretical Computer Science, Vol. A: Algorithms and Complexity. Elsevier and MIT Press 1990, ISBN 0-444-88071-2, ISBN 0-262-22038-5.
- Algorithms in Algebraic Number Theory. Bulletin of the AMS, vol. 26, 1992, pp. 211–244.
- Primality testing algorithms. Séminaire Bourbaki 1981.
- with Peter Stevenhagen: Artin reciprocity and Mersenne Primes. Nieuw Archief for Wiskunde 2000.
- with Peter Stevenhagen: Chebotarev and his density theorem. Mathematical Intelligencer 1992 (Online at Lenstra's Homepage).
- Profinite Fibonacci Numbers, December 2005, PDF

== See also ==
- Print Gallery (M. C. Escher)
