= Stephan Ramon Garcia =

American mathematician

Stephan Ramon Garcia is an American mathematician. He is the W.M. Keck Distinguished Service Professor and Professor of Mathematics at Pomona College, in California, United States. Garcia has been a faculty member at Pomona since 2006. Garcia works in operator theory, complex variables, matrix analysis, number theory, and discrete geometry. He serves on the editorial board of several well-known journals and has received four National Science Foundation grants as principal investigator.

== Early life and education ==
Garcia earned his Bachelor's of Arts with high distinction from the University of California, Berkeley in 1997 and received his PhD in Mathematics in 2003 from the University of California at Berkeley. He joined Pomona College in 2006, where he currently works.

== Published works ==
In addition to his 89 research articles, over the course of his academic career, Stephan Ramon Garcia has published four books as well. His first book, titled Introduction to Model Spaces and Their Operators was written in collaboration with Javed Mashreghi and William Ross and was published by Cambridge University Press in 2016. In 2017, Stephan Garcia had his second book published in collaboration with Robert Horn titled A Second Course in Linear Algebra by Cambridge University Press. Stephan Garcia's third book, Finite Blaschke Products and Their Connections was written in collaboration with Javad Mashreghi and William Ross and was subsequently published by Springer in 2018. Professor Garcia's most recent book entitled 100 Years of Math Milestones: The Pi Mu Epsilon Centennial Collection was written with Steven J. Miller and was published by the American Mathematical Society in July 2019.

== Awards ==
Throughout his academic career, Garcia has received a plethora of awards. In 1999, Garcia was given the title of Outstanding Graduate Student Instructor at the University of California at Berkeley. In 2005, Garcia was awarded the Mochizuki Memorial Fund Award by the University of California at Santa Barbara. In 2003, Garcia was awarded the Nikki Kose Memorial Teaching Prize. His first award with Pomona college was the Wig Distinguished Professor Award, which was awarded to him in May 2009. Garcia was nominated for CASE Professor of the Year in 2011 and 2012. Garcia was the first professor to receive the 2019 Mary P. Dolciani Award for Excellence in Research.

=== Grants and research distinctions ===
Garcia was chosen as the first recipient of the Mary P. Dolciani Excellence in Research for his extensive research history. Aside from publishing 89 research papers, Garcia has helped co-author 29 research articles by his students, some of whom have won awards under his supervision. Garcia has also received four National Science Foundation grants in the areas of complex symmetric operators and function theory (2006–10); Complex symmetric operators - theory and applications (2010–2014); Operators on Hilbert Space (2013–2016); and most recently in Opportunities in Operator Theory (2019–2021).
