= Bott–Samelson resolution =

In algebraic geometry, the Bott–Samelson resolution of a Schubert variety is a resolution of singularities. It was introduced by Bott & Samelson (1958) in the context of compact Lie groups. The algebraic formulation is independently due to Hansen (1973) and Demazure (1974).

== Definition ==
Let G be a connected reductive complex algebraic group, B a Borel subgroup and T a maximal torus contained in B.

Let $w \in W = N_G(T)/T.$ Any such w can be written as a product of reflections by simple roots. Fix minimal such an expression:

$$\underline{w} = (s_{i_1}, s_{i_2}, \ldots, s_{i_\ell})$$

so that $w = s_{i_1} s_{i_2} \cdots s_{i_\ell}$. (ℓ is the length of w.) Let $P_{i_j} \subset G$ be the subgroup generated by B and a representative of $s_{i_j}$. Let $Z_{\underline{w}}$ be the quotient:

$$Z_{\underline{w}} = P_{i_1} \times \cdots \times P_{i_\ell}/B^\ell$$

with respect to the action of $B^\ell$ by

$$(b_1, \ldots, b_\ell) \cdot (p_1, \ldots, p_\ell) = (p_1 b_1^{-1}, b_1 p_2 b_2^{-1}, \ldots, b_{\ell-1} p_\ell b_\ell^{-1}).$$

It is a smooth projective variety. Writing $X_w = \overline{BwB} / B = (P_{i_1} \cdots P_{i_\ell})/B$ for the Schubert variety for w, the multiplication map

$$\pi: Z_{\underline{w}} \to X_w$$

is a resolution of singularities called the Bott–Samelson resolution. $\pi$ has the property: $\pi_* \mathcal{O}_{Z_{\underline{w}}} = \mathcal{O}_{X_w}$ and $R^i \pi_* \mathcal{O}_{Z_{\underline{w}}} = 0, \, i \ge 1.$ In other words, $X_w$ has rational singularities.

There are also some other constructions; see, for example, Vakil (2006).
