= Journal of Difference Equations and Applications =

Scientific journal

- Discipline: Difference equations
- Language: English
- Edited by: Saber Elaydi

Publication details
- History: 1995—present
- Publisher: Taylor & Francis
- Frequency: Monthly
- Impact factor: 1 (2024)

Standard abbreviations
- ISO 4: J. Differ. Equ. Appl.

Indexing
- ISSN: 1023-6198 (print); 1563-5120 (web)

Links
- Journal homepage; Online access; Online archive

Journal of Difference Equations and Applications is a peer-reviewed scientific journal published monthly by Taylor & Francis. Established in 1995, it covers research on theory and applications of difference equations and discrete dynamical systems. Its current editor-in-chief is Saber Elaydi (Trinity University).

== Abstracting and indexing ==
The journal is abstracted and indexed in:

- Current Contents/Physical, Chemical & Earth Sciences
- EBSCO databases
- MathSciNet
- ProQuest databases
- Science Citation Index Expanded
- Scopus
- zbMATH Open

According to the Journal Citation Reports, the journal has a 2024 impact factor of 1.
