= Ian Grojnowski =

Australian mathematician

Ian Henry Grojnowski
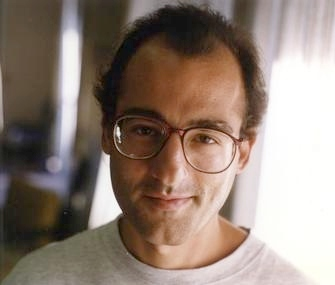
- Born: April 1966
- Citizenship: Australian
- Education: University of Sydney; Massachusetts Institute of Technology (PhD)
- Awards: Fröhlich Prize (2004)
- Scientific career
- Workplaces: University of Cambridge
- Thesis: Character Sheaves on Symmetric Spaces (1992)
- Doctoral advisor: George Lusztig
- Doctoral students: Kevin Costello

Ian Henry Grojnowski (born April 1966) is a mathematician working at the Department of Pure Mathematics and Mathematical Statistics at the University of Cambridge.

== Awards and honours ==
Grojnowski was the first recipient of the Fröhlich Prize of the London Mathematical Society in 2004 for his work in representation theory and algebraic geometry. The citation reads

Grojnowski's insights into geometric contexts for representation theory go back to his thesis with George Lusztig on character sheaves over homogeneous spaces. He has exploited these ideas to make breakthroughs in several completely unexpected areas, including representations of the affine Hecke algebras at roots of 1 (generalising results of Kazhdan and Lusztig), the representation theory of the symmetric groups S_{n} in characteristic p, the introduction (simultaneously with Nakajima) of vertex operators on the cohomology of the Hilbert schemes of finite subschemes of a complex algebraic surface, and (in joint work with Fishel and Teleman) the proof of the strong Macdonald conjecture of Hanlon and Feigin for reductive Lie algebras.
