= Michael J. Hopkins =

American mathematician (born 1958)

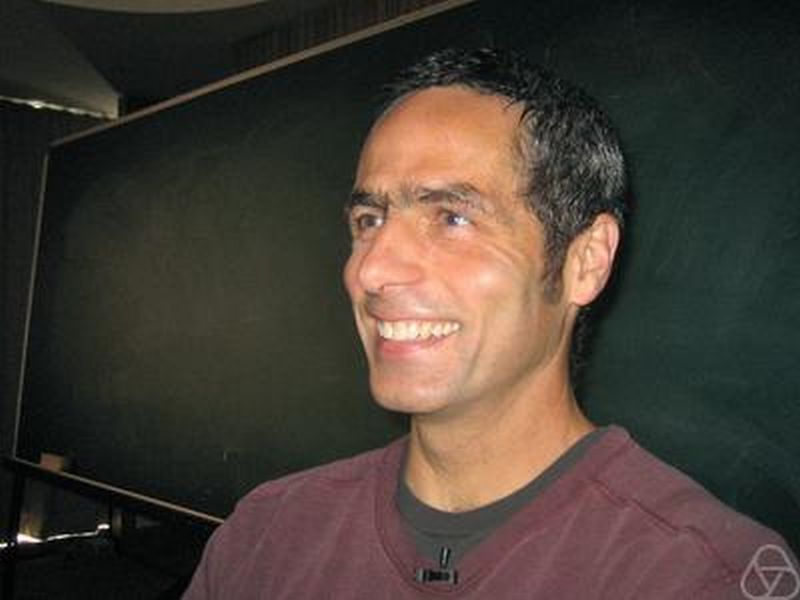
- Michael J. Hopkins, 2009
- Born: April 18, 1958 (age 68)
- Education: Northwestern University
- Known for: Nilpotence theorem in Mathematics; Topological modular forms Ando–Hopkins–Rezk orientation Kervaire invariant problem
- Awards: Veblen Prize (2001, 2022); NAS Award in Mathematics (2012); Nemmers Prize (2014); Senior Berwick Prize (2014)
- Scientific career
- Fields: Mathematics
- Workplaces: Harvard University
- Doctoral advisors: Mark Mahowald; Ioan James
- Doctoral students: Daniel Biss; Jacob Lurie; Charles Rezk; Reid Barton; Mike Hill

Michael Jerome Hopkins (born April 18, 1958) is an American mathematician known for work in algebraic topology.

== Life ==
He received his PhD from Northwestern University in 1984 under the direction of Mark Mahowald, with thesis Stable Decompositions of Certain Loop Spaces. Also in 1984 he also received his D.Phil. from the University of Oxford under the supervision of Ioan James. He has been Professor of mathematics at Harvard University since 2005, after fifteen years at the Massachusetts Institute of Technology, a few years of teaching at Princeton University, a one-year position with the University of Chicago, and a visiting lecturer position at Lehigh University.

== Work ==
Hopkins' work concentrates on algebraic topology, especially stable homotopy theory. It can roughly be divided into four parts (while the list of topics below is by no means exhaustive):

=== The Ravenel conjectures ===
The Ravenel conjectures very roughly say: complex cobordism (and its variants) see more in the stable homotopy category than you might think. For example, the nilpotence conjecture states that some suspension of some iteration of a map between finite CW-complexes is null-homotopic if it is zero in complex cobordism. This was proven by Ethan Devinatz, Hopkins and Jeff Smith (published in 1988). The rest of the Ravenel conjectures (except for the telescope conjecture) were proven by Hopkins and Smith soon after (published in 1998). Another result in this spirit proven by Hopkins and Douglas Ravenel is the chromatic convergence theorem, which states that one can recover a finite CW-complex from its localizations with respect to wedges of Morava K-theories.

=== Hopkins–Miller theorem and topological modular forms ===
This part of work is about refining a homotopy commutative diagram of ring spectra up to homotopy to a strictly commutative diagram of highly structured ring spectra. The first success of this program was the Hopkins–Miller theorem: It is about the action of the Morava stabilizer group on Lubin–Tate spectra (arising out of the deformation theory of formal group laws) and its refinement to $A_\infty$-ring spectra – this allowed to take homotopy fixed points of finite subgroups of the Morava stabilizer groups, which led to higher real K-theories. Together with Paul Goerss, Hopkins later set up a systematic obstruction theory for refinements to $E_\infty$-ring spectra. This was later used in the Hopkins–Miller construction of topological modular forms. Subsequent work of Hopkins on this topic includes papers on the question of the orientability of TMF with respect to string cobordism (joint work with Ando, Strickland and Rezk), known as Ando–Hopkins–Rezk orientation.

=== The Kervaire invariant problem ===
On April 21, 2009, Hopkins announced the solution of the Kervaire invariant problem, in joint work with Mike Hill and Douglas Ravenel. This problem is connected to the study of exotic spheres, but got transformed by work of William Browder into a problem in stable homotopy theory. The proof by Hill, Hopkins and Ravenel works purely in the stable homotopy setting and uses equivariant homotopy theory in a crucial way.

=== Work connected to geometry/physics ===
This includes papers on smooth and twisted K-theory and its relationship to loop groups and also work about (extended) topological field theories, joint with Daniel Freed, Jacob Lurie, and Constantin Teleman.

== Recognition ==
He gave invited addresses at the 1990 Winter Meeting of the American Mathematical Society in Louisville, Kentucky, at the 1994 International Congress of Mathematicians in Zurich, and was a plenary speaker at the 2002 International Congress of Mathematicians in Beijing. He presented the 1994 Everett Pitcher Lectures at Lehigh University, the 2000 Namboodiri Lectures at the University of Chicago, the 2000 Marston Morse Memorial Lectures at the Institute for Advanced Study, Princeton, the 2003 Ritt Lectures at Columbia University and the 2010 Bowen Lectures in Berkeley. In 2001 he was awarded the Oswald Veblen Prize in Geometry from the AMS for his work in homotopy theory, 2012 the NAS Award in Mathematics, 2014 the Senior Berwick Prize and also in 2014 the Nemmers Prize in Mathematics. He was named to the 2021 class of fellows of the American Mathematical Society "for contributions to algebraic topology and related areas of algebraic geometry, representation theory, and mathematical physics". In 2022 he received for the second time the Oswald Veblen Prize in Geometry.
