= Signature operator =

In mathematics, the signature operator is an elliptic differential operator defined on a certain subspace of the space of differential forms on an even-dimensional compact Riemannian manifold, whose analytic index is the same as the topological signature of the manifold if the dimension of the manifold is a multiple of four. It is an instance of a Dirac-type operator.

== Definition in the even-dimensional case ==
Let $M$ be a compact Riemannian manifold of even dimension $2l$. Let

$$d : \Omega^p(M)\rightarrow \Omega^{p+1}(M)$$

be the exterior derivative on $i$-th order differential forms on $M$. The Riemannian metric on $M$ allows us to define the Hodge star operator $\star$ and with it the inner product

$$\langle\omega,\eta\rangle=\int_M\omega\wedge\star\eta$$

on forms. Denote by

$$d^*: \Omega^{p+1}(M)\rightarrow \Omega^p(M)$$

the adjoint operator of the exterior differential $d$. This operator can be expressed purely in terms of the Hodge star operator as follows:

$$d^*=  (-1)^{2l(p+1) + 2l + 1} \star d  \star=  - \star d  \star$$

Now consider $d + d^*$ acting on the space of all forms $\Omega(M)=\bigoplus_{p=0}^{2l}\Omega^{p}(M)$. One way to consider this as a graded operator is the following: Let $\tau$ be an involution on the space of all forms defined by:

$$\tau(\omega)=i^{p(p-1)+l}\star \omega\quad,\quad\omega \in \Omega^p(M)$$

It is verified that $d + d^*$ anti-commutes with $\tau$ and, consequently, switches the $(\pm 1)$-eigenspaces $\Omega_{\pm}(M)$ of $\tau$

Consequently,

$$d + d^* = \begin{pmatrix} 0 & D \\ D^* & 0 \end{pmatrix}$$

Definition: The operator $d + d^*$ with the above grading respectively the above operator $D: \Omega_+(M) \rightarrow \Omega_-(M)$ is called the signature operator of $M$.

== Definition in the odd-dimensional case ==
In the odd-dimensional case one defines the signature operator to be $i(d+d^*)\tau$ acting on the even-dimensional forms of $M$.

== Hirzebruch Signature Theorem ==
If $l = 2k$, so that the dimension of $M$ is a multiple of four, then Hodge theory implies that:

$$\mathrm{index}(D) = \mathrm{sign}(M)$$

where the right hand side is the topological signature (i.e. the signature of a quadratic form on $H^{2k}(M)\$ defined by the cup product).

The Heat Equation approach to the Atiyah-Singer index theorem can then be used to show that:

$$\mathrm{sign}(M) = \int_M L(p_1,\ldots,p_l)$$

where $L$ is the Hirzebruch L-Polynomial, and the $p_i\$ the Pontrjagin forms on $M$.

== Homotopy invariance of the higher indices ==
Kaminker and Miller proved that the higher indices of the signature operator are homotopy-invariant.

== See also ==
- Hirzebruch signature theorem
- Pontryagin class
- Friedrich Hirzebruch
- Michael Atiyah
- Isadore Singer
