= Rokhlin's theorem =

On the intersection form of a smooth, closed 4-manifold with a spin structure

In 4-dimensional topology, a branch of mathematics, Rokhlin's theorem states that if a smooth, orientable, closed 4-manifold M has a spin structure (equivalently, if the second Stiefel–Whitney class $w_2(M)$ vanishes), then the signature of its intersection form, a quadratic form on the second cohomology group $H^2(M)$, is divisible by 16. The theorem is named for Vladimir Rokhlin, who proved it in 1952.

== Examples ==
- The intersection form on M

$$Q_M\colon H^2(M,\Z)\times H^2(M,\Z)\rightarrow \mathbb{Z}$$

is unimodular on $\Z$ by Poincaré duality, and the vanishing of $w_2(M)$ implies that the intersection form is even. By a theorem of Cahit Arf, any even unimodular lattice has signature divisible by 8, so Rokhlin's theorem forces one extra factor of 2 to divide the signature.

- A K3 surface is compact, 4 dimensional, and $w_2(M)$ vanishes, and the signature is −16, so 16 is the best possible number in Rokhlin's theorem.
- A complex surface in $\mathbb{CP}^3$ of degree $d$ is spin if and only if $d$ is even. It has signature $(4-d^2)d/3$, which can be seen from Friedrich Hirzebruch's signature theorem. The case $d=4$ gives back the last example of a K3 surface.
- Michael Freedman's E8 manifold is a simply connected compact topological manifold with vanishing $w_2(M)$ and intersection form $E_8$ of signature 8. Rokhlin's theorem implies that this manifold has no smooth structure. This manifold shows that Rokhlin's theorem fails for the set of merely topological (rather than smooth) manifolds.
- If the manifold M is simply connected (or more generally if the first homology group has no 2-torsion), then the vanishing of $w_2(M)$ is equivalent to the intersection form being even. This is not true in general: an Enriques surface is a compact smooth 4 manifold and has even intersection form II_{1,9} of signature −8 (not divisible by 16), but the class $w_2(M)$ does not vanish and is represented by a torsion element in the second cohomology group.

== Proofs ==
Rokhlin's theorem can be deduced from the fact that the third stable homotopy group of spheres $\pi^S_3$ is cyclic of order 24; this is Rokhlin's original approach.

It can also be deduced from the Atiyah–Singer index theorem. See Â genus and Rochlin's theorem.

Robion Kirby (1989) gives a geometric proof.

== The Rokhlin invariant ==
Since Rokhlin's theorem states that the signature of a spin smooth manifold is divisible by 16, the definition of the Rokhlin invariant is deduced as follows:

For 3-manifold $N$ and a spin structure $s$ on $N$, the Rokhlin invariant $\mu(N,s)$ in $\Z/16\mathbb{Z}$ is defined to be the signature of any smooth compact spin 4-manifold with spin boundary $(N,s)$.

If N is a spin 3-manifold then it bounds a spin 4-manifold M. The signature of M is divisible by 8, and an easy application of Rokhlin's theorem shows that its value mod 16 depends only on N and not on the choice of M. Homology 3-spheres have a unique spin structure so we can define the Rokhlin invariant of a homology 3-sphere to be the element $\operatorname{sign}(M)/8$ of $\Z/2\Z$, where M any spin 4-manifold bounding the homology sphere.

For example, the Poincaré homology sphere bounds a spin 4-manifold with intersection form $E_8$, so its Rokhlin invariant is 1. This result has some elementary consequences: the Poincaré homology sphere does not admit a smooth embedding in $S^4$, nor does it bound a Mazur manifold.

More generally, if N is a spin 3-manifold (for example, any $\Z/2\Z$ homology sphere), then the signature of any spin 4-manifold M with boundary N is well defined mod 16, and is called the Rokhlin invariant of N. On a topological 3-manifold N, the generalized Rokhlin invariant refers to the function whose domain is the spin structures on N, and which evaluates to the Rokhlin invariant of the pair $(N,s)$ where s is a spin structure on N.

The Rokhlin invariant of M is equal to half the Casson invariant mod 2. The Casson invariant is viewed as the Z-valued lift of the Rokhlin invariant of integral homology 3-sphere.

== Generalizations ==
The Kervaire–Milnor theorem (Kervaire & Milnor 1960) states that if $\Sigma$ is a characteristic sphere in a smooth compact 4-manifold M, then

$$\operatorname{signature}(M) = \Sigma \cdot \Sigma \bmod 16$$.

A characteristic sphere is an embedded 2-sphere whose homology class represents the Stiefel–Whitney class $w_2(M)$. If $w_2(M)$ vanishes, we can take $\Sigma$ to be any small sphere, which has self intersection number 0, so Rokhlin's theorem follows.

The Freedman–Kirby theorem (Freedman & Kirby 1978) states that if $\Sigma$ is a characteristic surface in a smooth compact 4-manifold M, then

$$\operatorname{signature}(M) = \Sigma \cdot \Sigma + 8\operatorname{Arf}(M,\Sigma) \bmod 16$$.

where $\operatorname{Arf}(M,\Sigma)$ is the Arf invariant of a certain quadratic form on $H_1(\Sigma, \Z/2\Z)$. This Arf invariant is obviously 0 if $\Sigma$ is a sphere, so the Kervaire–Milnor theorem is a special case.

A generalization of the Freedman-Kirby theorem to topological (rather than smooth) manifolds states that

$$\operatorname{signature}(M) = \Sigma \cdot \Sigma + 8\operatorname{Arf}(M,\Sigma)  + 8\operatorname{ks}(M) \bmod 16$$,

where $\operatorname{ks}(M)$ is the Kirby–Siebenmann invariant of M. The Kirby–Siebenmann invariant of M is 0 if M is smooth.

Armand Borel and Friedrich Hirzebruch proved the following theorem: If X is a smooth compact spin manifold of dimension divisible by 4 then the Â genus is an integer, and is even if the dimension of X is 4 mod 8. This can be deduced from the Atiyah–Singer index theorem: Michael Atiyah and Isadore Singer showed that the Â genus is the index of the Atiyah–Singer operator, which is always integral, and is even in dimensions 4 mod 8. For a 4-dimensional manifold, the Hirzebruch signature theorem shows that the signature is −8 times the Â genus, so in dimension 4 this implies Rokhlin's theorem.

Ochanine (1980) proved that if X is a compact oriented smooth spin manifold of dimension 4 mod 8, then its signature is divisible by 16.
