= Ushadevi Bhosle =

Indian mathematician

- Other names: Narendra
- Education: University of Pune (B.Sc; 1969); Shivaji University (M.Sc.; 1971); Tata Institute of Fundamental Research (PhD; 1980)
- Occupation: Mathematician Educator Researcher
- Employer: Tata Institute of Fundamental Research Indian Institute of Science, Bangalore
- Known for: specialises in Algebraic Geometry
- Notable work: worked on the moduli spaces of bundles
- Awards: awarded by Stree Shakti Science Samman 2010 Ramaswamy Aiyer Memorial Award 2000

Dr. Ushadevi Narendra Bhosle is an Indian mathematician, educator and researcher. She specialises in Algebraic Geometry. She worked on the moduli spaces of bundles.

== Early life and education ==
She earned a B.Sc. degree in 1969 and an M.Sc. degree in 1971 from University of Pune, Shivaji University, respectively. She commenced her post-graduate studies in 1971 from Tata Institute of Fundamental Research and got her PhD under the guidance of her mentor S. Ramanan in 1980.

== Career ==
She has spent most of her career at Tata Institute of Fundamental Research where she was employed as a research associate from 1971 to 1974, a Research Associate II from 1974 to 1977, a Research Fellow from 1977 to 1982, a Fellow from 1982 to 1990, and a Reader from 1991 to 1995. She was made an Associate Professor in 1995, a Professor in 1998, and a Senior Professor in 2012.

She left the Tata Institute of Fundamental Research in 2014 to become the Raja Ramanna fellow at Indian Institute of Science, Bangalore, a position she held until 2017. She has been INSA Senior Scientist at Indian Statistical Institute, Bangalore since January 2019.

== Membership ==
She is the member of FASc, FNASc, FNASI and VBAC international committees. She also was the senior associate of International Centre of Theoretical Physics in Italy. She was a fellow member of the Indian National Science Academy, Indian Academy of Sciences, and National Academy of Sciences, Allahabad, India.

== Works ==
She has 66 publications.

- Desale U.V. and Ramanan S. Poincare Polynomials of the variety of stable bundles, Math. Ann.vol. 216, no.3,(1975)233-244.
- Desale U.V. and Ramanan S.: Classification of vector bundles of

rank two on hyperelliptic curves. Invent. Math. 38, 161-185 (1976).

- Bhosle (Desale) Usha N.:

Moduli of orthogonal and spin bundles over hyperelliptic curves. Compositio Math. 51, 15-40 (1984).

- Bhosle, U. N. (1989). "Parabolic vector bundles on curves". Arkiv för Matematik. 27 (1–2): 15–22. Bibcode:1989ArM....27...15B. doi:10.1007/BF02386356. ISSN 0004-2080.
- Bhosle, Usha N. (1999). "Picard groups of the moduli spaces of vector bundles". Mathematische Annalen. 314 (2): 245–263. doi:10.1007/s002080050293. ISSN 0025-5831.
- Bhosle, Usha N. (1996). "Generalized parabolic bundles and applications— II". Proceedings Mathematical Sciences. 106 (4): 403–420. doi:10.1007/BF02837696. ISSN 0253-4142.
- Bhosle Usha N. (1992), Parabolic sheaves on higher dimensional varieties,Math. Ann. 293 177–192
- Bhosle, U.N. (1986): Nets of quadrics and vector bundles on a double plane. Math. Zeit.192, 29–43
- Bhosle Usha N. (1992), Generalised parabolic bundles and applications to torsion-free sheaves on nodal curves.Ark. Mat. 30 187–215
- Bhosle, U.N. (1989), Ramanathan, A.: Moduli of parabolicG-bundles on curves. Math. Z.202, 161–180
- BHOSLE, U. (1999). VECTOR BUNDLES ON CURVES WITH MANY COMPONENTS. Proceedings of the London Mathematical Society, 79(1), 81-106.
- Bhosle Usha N (1995), Representations of the fundamental group and vector bundles,Math. Ann.302 601–608

== Awards and honours ==
She was awarded by Stree Shakti Science Samman in 2010 and Ramaswamy Aiyer Memorial Award in 2000.

== Personal life ==
Apart from mathematics, her other interests are drawing, painting, reading and music. Currently, she lives in Mumbai.
