= K. David Elworthy =

British academic author (born 1940)

Kenneth David Elworthy
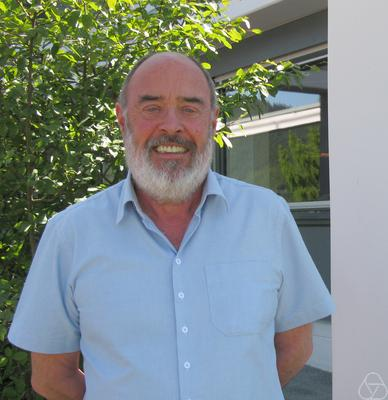
- K. David Elworthy
- Born: 21 December 1940 (age 85)
- Education: Bristol Grammar School
- Alma mater: Merton College, Oxford
- Spouse: Susan Margaret Anderson (m. 1964)

Kenneth David Elworthy is a professor emeritus of mathematics at the University of Warwick. He works on stochastic analysis, stochastic differential equations and geometric analysis.

== Life and career ==
Elworthy was born on 21 December 1940. He was educated at Bristol Grammar School, and in 1959 went up to Merton College, Oxford to read Mathematics as an undergraduate. In 1964 he married Susan Margaret Anderson. His DPhil was completed in 1967 under the supervision of Michael Francis Atiyah at the University of Oxford. Before his retirement from Warwick, he held a personal chair there. He also serves on the advisory board of the Center for Integrative Mathematical Sciences at Keio University in Tokyo, Japan.

Together with Xue-Mei Li and Yves Le Jan he wrote the books "The Geometry of Filtering" and "On the Geometry of Diffusion Operators and Stochastic Flows".
