= Atiyah conjecture on configurations =

Mathematical conjecture

In mathematics, the Atiyah conjecture on configurations is a conjecture introduced by Atiyah (2000, 2001) stating that a certain n by n matrix depending on n points in R^{3} is always non-singular.

== See also ==
- Berry–Robbins problem
