= Berry–Robbins problem =

Mathematics problem

In mathematics, the Berry–Robbins problem asks whether there is a continuous map from configurations of n points in R^{3} to the flag manifold U(n)/T^{n} that is compatible with the action of the symmetric group on n points. It was posed by Berry and Robbins in 1997, and solved positively by Atiyah in 2000.

== See also ==
- Atiyah conjecture on configurations
