= S. Ramanan =

Indian mathematician (born 1937)

Sundararaman Ramanan
- Born: Sundararaman Ramanan; 20 July 1937 (age 89); Tiruvannamalai
- Education: Tata Institute of Fundamental Research, Mumbai; Ramakrishna Mission Vivekananda College, Chennai
- Awards: Shanti Swarup Bhatnagar Prize for Science and Technology, Srinivasa Ramanujan Medal, TWAS Prize for Mathematics
- Scientific career
- Fields: Algebraic geometry, moduli spaces, Lie groups
- Workplaces: Chennai Mathematical Institute, Chennai Institute of Mathematical Sciences, Chennai
- Doctoral advisor: MS Narasimhan

Sundararaman Ramanan (born 20 July 1937) is an Indian mathematician who works in the area of algebraic geometry, moduli spaces and Lie groups. He is one of India's leading mathematicians and recognised as an expert in algebraic geometry, especially in the area of moduli problems. He has also worked in differential geometry: his joint paper with MS Narasimhan on universal connections has been influential. It enabled SS Chern and B Simons to introduce what is known as the Chern-Simons invariant, which has proved useful in theoretical physics.

== Education and career ==
He is an alumnus of the Ramakrishna Mission School in Chennai and the Vivekananda College in Chennai, where he completed a BA Honours in mathematics. He completed his PhD at the Tata Institute of Fundamental Research, under the direction of MS Narasimhan. He did his post-doctoral studies at the University of Oxford, Harvard University and ETH Zurich.

He later pursued a career at TIFR. He picked up the methods of modern differential geometry from the French mathematician Jean-Louis Koszul, and later successfully applied it for his research centred on algebraic geometry. He has also made contributions to the topics of Abelian variety and vector bundles.

== Collaborations and influences ==
He collaborated with Raoul Bott, who was at Harvard University. He has been a visiting professor at Harvard University, University of California at Berkeley, the Institute of Advanced Study in Princeton, UCLA, University of Oxford, Cambridge University, the Max Planck Institute and University of Paris. In 1978, he gave one of the invited talks at the International Congress of Mathematicians in Helsinki. In 1999, he spoke about some aspects of the work of André Weil on the occasion of his being awarded the Inamouri Prize.

Ramanan discovered and encouraged Vijay Kumar Patodi, who proved part of the Atiyah-Singer index theorem, Patodi did his PhD under the combined direction of Narasimhan and Ramanan. Ramanan was MS Raghunathan's senior colleague and influenced him considerably.

Ramanan wrote the book Moduli of Abelian Varieties with Allan Adler, published by Springer-Verlag, and a graduate-level book on algebraic geometry called Global Calculus, published by the American Mathematical Society. He continues his contributions via teaching and mentoring at the Chennai Mathematical Institute, where he is an adjunct professor, and at the Institute of Mathematical Sciences, Chennai.

== Awards ==
Ramanan received the Shanti Swarup Bhatnagar Prize, India's highest science prize, in 1979; the TWAS Prize for Mathematics in 2001 and the Ramanujan Medal in 2008.

== Personal life ==
He is married to Anuradha Ramanan, a translator and former librarian. They have two daughters, Sumana Ramanan, a journalist, and Kavita Ramanan, a noted mathematician who is a professor of applied mathematics at Brown University in Providence, Rhode Island.

== Selected publications ==
- I. Biswas & S. Ramanan (1994). "An infinitesimal study of the moduli of Hitchin pairs". Journal of the London Mathematical Society. 49 (2): 219–231. doi:10.1112/jlms/49.2.219.
