= Yves Le Jan =

French mathematician (born 1952)

Yves Le Jan (born 15 April 1952 in Grenoble) is a French mathematician working in probability theory and stochastic processes.

Le Jan studied from 1971 to 1974 at the École normale supérieure, finishing with an Agrégation. 1975 he became a researcher (Attaché de Recherche) at the CNRS (from 1987 Directeur de Recherche) and in 1979 obtained his PhD (Doctorat d´Etat). Since 1993 he is professor at the University of Paris-Sud. From 2001 to 2004 he was leading its group on probability theory and statistics.

In 2006 he was invited speaker at the International Congress of Mathematicians in Madrid (New developments in stochastic dynamics). In 2008 he became Senior Member of the Institut Universitaire de France. In 2011 he was Doob Lecturer at the 8th World Congress in Probability and Statistics in Istanbul.

In 2011 he was awarded the Sophie Germain Prize and in 1995 the Poncelet Prize of the French Academy of Sciences.

From 2000 to 2006 he was Editor of Annales Henri Poincaré.

== Books ==
- with Jacques Franchi Hyperbolic dynamics and Brownian motion : an introduction, Oxford University Press 2012
- with K. David Elworthy, Xue-Mei Li The Geometry of Filtering, Birkhäuser 2010
- with K. David Elworthy, Xue-Mei Li On the geometry of diffusion operators and stochastic flows, Springer Verlag 1999
- Markov paths, loops and fields, École d’Été de Probabilités de Saint-Flour XXXVIII-2008, Springer Verlag 2011
