= Atiyah conjecture =

In mathematics, the Atiyah conjecture is a collective term for a number of statements about restrictions on possible values of $l^2$-Betti numbers.

== History ==
In 1976, Michael Atiyah introduced $l^2$-cohomology of manifolds with a free co-compact action of a discrete countable group (e.g. the universal cover of a compact manifold together with the action of the fundamental group by deck transformations.) Atiyah defined also $l^2$-Betti numbers as von Neumann dimensions of the resulting $l^2$-cohomology groups, and computed several examples, which all turned out to be rational numbers. He therefore asked if it is possible for $l^2$-Betti numbers to be irrational.

Since then, various researchers asked more refined questions about possible values of $l^2$-Betti numbers, all of which are customarily referred to as "Atiyah conjecture".

== Results ==
Many positive results were proven by Peter Linnell. For example, if the group acting is a free group, then the $l^2$-Betti numbers are integers.

The most general question open as of late 2011 is whether $l^2$-Betti numbers are rational if there is a bound on the orders of finite subgroups of the group which acts. In fact, a precise relationship between possible denominators and the orders in question is conjectured; in the case of torsion-free groups, this statement generalizes the zero-divisors conjecture. For a discussion see the article of B. Eckmann.

In the case there is no such bound, Tim Austin showed in 2009 that $l^2$-Betti numbers can assume transcendental values. Later it was shown that in that case they can be any non-negative real numbers.
