= Winfried Scharlau =

German mathematician (1940–2020)

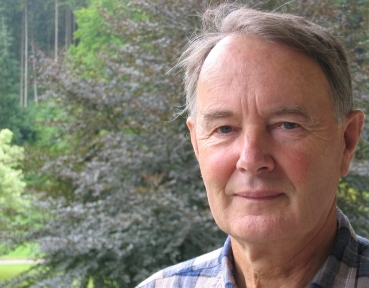
Winfried Scharlau in 2006.

Winfried Scharlau (12 August 1940, in Berlin – 26 November 2020) was a German mathematician.

== Biography ==
Scharlau received his doctorate in 1967 from the University of Bonn. His doctoral thesis Quadratische Formen und Galois-Cohomologie (Quadratic Forms and Galois Cohomology) was supervised by Friedrich Hirzebruch. Scharlau was at the Institute for Advanced Study for the academic year 1969–1970 and in spring 1972. From 1970 he was a professor (most recent Institutsdirektor) at the University of Münster, from where he retired.

Scharlau's research deals with number theory and, in particular, the theory of quadratic forms, about which he wrote a 1985 monograph Quadratic and Hermitian Forms in Springer's series Grundlehren der mathematischen Wissenschaften.

Scharlau was also an amateur ornithologist and author of two novels, I megali istoria - die große Geschichte (2nd edition 2001), set on the Greek island of Naxos, and Scharife (2001), set on the island of Zanzibar in the 19th century. He also deals with the history of mathematics and wrote, with Hans Opolka, a historically-oriented introduction to number theory. Their book presents, among other topics, the analytical class number formula of Dirichlet and the geometry of the numbers in the 19th century. Scharlau wrote a multi-part biography of Alexander Grothendieck.

Scharlau was a corresponding member of the Göttingen Academy of Sciences and Humanities. From 1991 to 1992 he was president of the German Mathematical Society. In 1974 he was invited as speaker with talks On subspaces of inner product spaces at the International Congress of Mathematicians in Vancouver.

He was the father of the cognitive psychologist Ingrid Scharlau.

== Selected publications ==
- with Friedrich Hirzebruch: Einführung in die Funktionalanalysis, BI, Mannheim 1971, ISBN 978-3-411-00296-2, Hirzebruch Collection (PDF)
- Scharlau, Winfried (1972). "Quadratic reciprocity laws". Journal of Number Theory. 4 (1): 78–97. Bibcode:1972JNT.....4...78S. doi:10.1016/0022-314X(72)90012-1. ISSN 0022-314X.
- with H.-G. Quebbemann and Manfred Schultz: Quadratic and Hermitian forms in additive and abelian categories, Journal of Algebra vol. 59, no. 2, 264-289 1979
- with Manfred Knebusch: Algebraic theory of quadratic forms: generic methods and Pfister forms, vol. 1. Birkhäuser, 1980 (DMV Seminary, notes taken by Heisook Lee)
- with Hans Opolka: Von Fermat bis Minkowski. Eine Vorlesung über die Zahlentheorie und ihre Entwicklung. Springer, Berlin 1980
- Richard Dedekind 1831/1981. Vieweg, Braunschweig [et alia loca] 1981
- Quadratic and Hermitian Forms. Grundlehren der Mathematischen Wissenschaften 270. Springer, Berlin [et alia loca] 1985
- Mathematische Institute in Deutschland 1800–1945. Dokumente zur Geschichte der Mathematik. Vieweg, Braunschweig [et alia loca] 1990
- Schulwissen Mathematik. Ein Überblick. Vieweg, Braunschweig [et alia loca] 1994
- Beiträge zur Vogelwelt der südlichen Ägäis. Verlag C. Lienau, 1999
- Scharlau, Winfried (2000). "On the history of the algebraic theory of quadratic forms". Quadratic Forms and Their Applications. Contemporary Mathematics. Vol. 272. pp. 229–259. doi:10.1090/conm/272/04406. ISBN 9780821827796. ISSN 1098-3627.
- Mathematik für Naturwissenschaftler. LIT Verlag, Münster 2005
- Winfried Scharlau (2011), Wer ist Alexander Grothendieck? Anarchie, Mathematik, Spiritualität, Einsamkeit (in German), vol. Teil 1. Anarchie (3. ed.), Norderstedt: Books on Demand, ISBN 978-3-8423-7147-7
- Winfried Scharlau (2010), Wer ist Alexander Grothendieck? Anarchie, Mathematik, Spiritualität, Einsamkeit (in German), vol. Teil 3. Spiritualität, Norderstedt: Books on Demand, ISBN 978-3-8391-4939-3
- Winfried Scharlau (2016), Das Glück, Mathematiker zu sein. Friedrich Hirzebruch und seine Zeit (in German), Wiesbaden: Springer Spektrum, ISBN 978-3-658-14756-3
