= Atiyah–Singer index theorem =

Mathematical result in differential geometry

- Field: Differential geometry
- First proof by: Michael Atiyah and Isadore Singer
- First proof in: 1963
- Consequences: Chern–Gauss–Bonnet theorem Grothendieck–Riemann–Roch theorem Hirzebruch signature theorem Rokhlin's theorem

In differential geometry, the Atiyah–Singer index theorem, proved by Michael Atiyah and Isadore Singer (1963), states that for an elliptic differential operator on a compact manifold, the analytical index (related to the dimension of the space of solutions) is equal to the topological index (defined in terms of some topological data). It includes many other theorems, such as the Chern–Gauss–Bonnet theorem and Riemann–Roch theorem, as special cases, and has applications to theoretical physics.

== History ==
The index problem for elliptic differential operators was posed by Israel Gel'fand. He noticed the homotopy invariance of the index, and asked for a formula for it by means of topological invariants. Some of the motivating examples included the Riemann–Roch theorem and its generalization the Hirzebruch–Riemann–Roch theorem, and the Hirzebruch signature theorem. Friedrich Hirzebruch and Armand Borel had proved the integrality of the Â genus of a spin manifold, and Atiyah suggested that this integrality could be explained if it were the index of the Dirac operator (which was rediscovered by Atiyah and Singer in 1961).

The Atiyah–Singer theorem was announced in 1963. The proof sketched in this announcement was never published by them, though it appears in Palais's book. It appears also in the "Séminaire Cartan-Schwartz 1963/64" that was held in Paris simultaneously with the seminar led by Richard Palais at Princeton University. The last talk in Paris was by Atiyah on manifolds with boundary. Their first published proof replaced the cobordism theory of the first proof with K-theory, and they used this to give proofs of various generalizations in another sequence of papers.

- 1965: Sergey P. Novikov published his results on the topological invariance of the rational Pontryagin classes on smooth manifolds.
- Robion Kirby and Laurent C. Siebenmann's results, combined with René Thom's paper proved the existence of rational Pontryagin classes on topological manifolds. The rational Pontryagin classes are essential ingredients of the index theorem on smooth and topological manifolds.
- 1969: Michael Atiyah defines abstract elliptic operators on arbitrary metric spaces. Abstract elliptic operators became protagonists in Kasparov's theory and Connes's noncommutative differential geometry.
- 1971: Isadore Singer proposes a comprehensive program for future extensions of index theory.
- 1972: Gennadi G. Kasparov publishes his work on the realization of K-homology by abstract elliptic operators.
- 1973: Atiyah, Raoul Bott, and Vijay Patodi gave a new proof of the index theorem using the heat equation, described in a paper by Melrose.
- 1977: Dennis Sullivan establishes his theorem on the existence and uniqueness of Lipschitz and quasiconformal structures on topological manifolds of dimension different from 4.
- 1983: Ezra Getzler motivated by ideas of Edward Witten and Luis Alvarez-Gaume, gave a short proof of the local index theorem for operators that are locally Dirac operators; this covers many of the useful cases.
- 1983: Nicolae Teleman proves that the analytical indices of signature operators with values in vector bundles are topological invariants.
- 1984: Teleman establishes the index theorem on topological manifolds.
- 1986: Alain Connes publishes his fundamental paper on noncommutative geometry.
- 1989: Simon K. Donaldson and Sullivan study Yang–Mills theory on quasiconformal manifolds of dimension 4. They introduce the signature operator S defined on differential forms of degree two.
- 1990: Connes and Henri Moscovici prove the local index formula in the context of non-commutative geometry.
- 1994: Connes, Sullivan, and Teleman prove the index theorem for signature operators on quasiconformal manifolds.

== Notation ==
- X is a compact smooth manifold (without boundary).
- E and F are smooth vector bundles over X.
- D is an elliptic differential operator from E to F. So in local coordinates it acts as a differential operator, taking smooth sections of E to smooth sections of F.

== Symbol of a differential operator ==
If D is a differential operator on a Euclidean space of order n in k variables $x_1, \dots, x_k$, then its symbol is the function of 2k variables $x_1, \dots, x_k, y_1, \dots, y_k$, given by dropping all terms of order less than n and replacing $\partial/\partial x_i$ by $y_i$. So the symbol is homogeneous in the variables y, of degree n. The symbol is well defined even though $\partial/\partial x_i$ does not commute with $x_i$ because we keep only the highest order terms and differential operators commute "up to lower-order terms". The operator is called elliptic if the symbol is nonzero whenever at least one y is nonzero.

Example: The Laplace operator in k variables has symbol $y_1^2 + \cdots + y_k^2$, and so is elliptic as this is nonzero whenever any of the $y_i$'s are nonzero. The wave operator has symbol $-y_1^2 + \cdots + y_k^2$, which is not elliptic if $k\ge 2$, as the symbol vanishes for some non-zero values of the ys.

The symbol of a differential operator of order n on a smooth manifold X is defined in much the same way using local coordinate charts, and is a function on the cotangent bundle of X, homogeneous of degree n on each cotangent space. (In general, differential operators transform in a rather complicated way under coordinate transforms (see jet bundle); however, the highest order terms transform like tensors so we get well defined homogeneous functions on the cotangent spaces that are independent of the choice of local charts.) More generally, the symbol of a differential operator between two vector bundles E and F is a section of the pullback of the bundle Hom(E, F) to the cotangent space of X. The differential operator is called elliptic if the element of Hom(E_{x}, F_{x}) is invertible for all non-zero cotangent vectors at any point x of X.

A key property of elliptic operators is that they are almost invertible; this is closely related to the fact that their symbols are almost invertible. More precisely, an elliptic operator D on a compact manifold has a (non-unique) parametrix (or pseudoinverse) D′ such that DD′ -1 and D′D -1 are both compact operators. An important consequence is that the kernel of D is finite-dimensional, because all eigenspaces of compact operators, other than the kernel, are finite-dimensional. (The pseudoinverse of an elliptic differential operator is almost never a differential operator. However, it is an elliptic pseudodifferential operator.)

== Analytical index ==
As the elliptic differential operator D has a pseudoinverse, it is a Fredholm operator. Any Fredholm operator has an index, defined as the difference between the (finite) dimension of the kernel of D (solutions of Df = 0), and the (finite) dimension of the cokernel of D (the constraints on the right-hand-side of an inhomogeneous equation like Df = g, or equivalently the kernel of the adjoint operator). In other words,

Index(D) = dim Ker(D) − dim Coker(D) = dim Ker(D) − dim Ker(D*).

This is sometimes called the analytical index of D.

Example: Suppose that the manifold is the circle (thought of as R/Z), and D is the operator d/dx − λ for some complex constant λ. (This is the simplest example of an elliptic operator.) Then the kernel is the space of multiples of exp(λx) if λ is an integral multiple of 2πi and is 0 otherwise, and the kernel of the adjoint is a similar space with λ replaced by its complex conjugate. So D has index 0. This example shows that the kernel and cokernel of elliptic operators can jump discontinuously as the elliptic operator varies, so there is no nice formula for their dimensions in terms of continuous topological data. However the jumps in the dimensions of the kernel and cokernel are the same, so the index, given by the difference of their dimensions, does indeed vary continuously, and can be given in terms of topological data by the index theorem.

== Topological index ==
The topological index of an elliptic differential operator $D$ between smooth vector bundles $E$ and $F$ on an $n$-dimensional compact manifold $X$ is given by

$$(-1)^n\operatorname{ch}(D)\operatorname{Td}(X)[X] = (-1)^n\int_X \operatorname{ch}(D)\operatorname{Td}(X)$$

in other words the value of the top dimensional component of the mixed cohomology class $\operatorname{ch}(D) \operatorname{Td}(X)$ on the fundamental homology class of the manifold $X$ up to a difference of sign. Here,

- $\operatorname{Td}(X)$ is the Todd class of the complexified tangent bundle of $X$.
- $\operatorname{ch}(D)$ is equal to $\varphi^{-1}(\operatorname{ch}(d(p^*E,p^*F, \sigma(D))))$, where
  - $\varphi: H^k(X;\mathbb{Q}) \to H^{n+k}(B(X)/S(X);\mathbb{Q})$ is the Thom isomorphism for the sphere bundle $p:B(X)/S(X) \to X$
  - $\operatorname{ch}:K(X)\otimes\mathbb{Q} \to H^*(X;\mathbb{Q})$ is the Chern character
  - $d(p^*E,p^*F,\sigma(D))$ is the "difference element" in $K(B(X)/S(X))$ associated to two vector bundles $p^*E$ and $p^*F$ on $B(X)$ and an isomorphism $\sigma(D)$ between them on the subspace $S(X)$.
  - $\sigma(D)$ is the symbol of $D$

In some situations, it is possible to simplify the above formula for computational purposes. In particular, if $X$ is a $2m$-dimensional orientable (compact) manifold with non-zero Euler class $e(TX)$, then applying the Thom isomorphism and dividing by the Euler class, the topological index may be expressed as

$$(-1)^m\int_X \frac{\operatorname{ch}(E)-\operatorname{ch}(F)}{e(TX)}\operatorname{Td}(X)$$

where division makes sense by pulling $e(TX)^{-1}$ back from the cohomology ring of the classifying space $BSO$.

One can also define the topological index using only K-theory (and this alternative definition is compatible in a certain sense with the Chern-character construction above). If X is a compact submanifold of a manifold Y then there is a pushforward (or "shriek") map from K(TX) to K(TY). The topological index of an element of K(TX) is defined to be the image of this operation with Y some Euclidean space, for which K(TY) can be naturally identified with the integers Z (as a consequence of Bott-periodicity). This map is independent of the embedding of X in Euclidean space. Now a differential operator as above naturally defines an element of K(TX), and the image in Z under this map "is" the topological index.

As usual, D is an elliptic differential operator between vector bundles E and F over a compact manifold X.

The index problem is the following: compute the (analytical) index of D using only the symbol s and topological data derived from the manifold and the vector bundle. The Atiyah–Singer index theorem solves this problem, and states:

The analytical index of D is equal to its topological index.

In spite of its formidable definition, the topological index is usually straightforward to evaluate explicitly. So this makes it possible to evaluate the analytical index. (The cokernel and kernel of an elliptic operator are in general extremely hard to evaluate individually; the index theorem shows that we can usually at least evaluate their difference.) Many important invariants of a manifold (such as the signature) can be given as the index of suitable differential operators, so the index theorem allows us to evaluate these invariants in terms of topological data.

Although the analytical index is usually hard to evaluate directly, it is at least obviously an integer. The topological index is by definition a rational number, but it is usually not at all obvious from the definition that it is also integral. So the Atiyah–Singer index theorem implies some deep integrality properties, as it implies that the topological index is integral.

The index of an elliptic differential operator obviously vanishes if the operator is self adjoint. It also vanishes if the manifold X has odd dimension, though there are pseudodifferential elliptic operators whose index does not vanish in odd dimensions.

=== Relation to Grothendieck–Riemann–Roch ===
The Grothendieck–Riemann–Roch theorem was one of the main motivations behind the index theorem because the index theorem is the counterpart of this theorem in the setting of real manifolds. Now, if there's a map $f:X\to Y$ of compact stably almost complex manifolds, then there is a commutative diagram

$$\begin{array}{ccc}
& & & \\
& K(X) & \xrightarrow[]{\text{Td}(X)\cdot\text{ch}} & H(X;\mathbb{Q}) & \\
& f_* \Bigg\downarrow && \Bigg\downarrow f_*\\
& K(Y) & \xrightarrow[\text{Td}(Y)\cdot\text{ch}]{} & H(Y;\mathbb{Q})  & \\
& & & \\
\end{array}$$

if $Y = *$ is a point, then we recover the statement above. Here $K(X)$ is the Grothendieck group of complex vector bundles. This commutative diagram is formally very similar to the GRR theorem because the cohomology groups on the right are replaced by the Chow ring of a smooth variety, and the Grothendieck group on the left is given by the Grothendieck group of algebraic vector bundles.

== Extensions of the Atiyah–Singer index theorem ==
=== Teleman index theorem ===
Due to (Teleman 1983), (Teleman 1984):

For any abstract elliptic operator (Atiyah 1970) on a closed, oriented, topological manifold, the analytical index equals the topological index.

The proof of this result goes through specific considerations, including the extension of Hodge theory on combinatorial and Lipschitz manifolds (Teleman 1980), (Teleman 1983), the extension of Atiyah–Singer's signature operator to Lipschitz manifolds (Teleman 1983), Kasparov's K-homology (Kasparov 1972) and topological cobordism (Kirby & Siebenmann 1977).

This result shows that the index theorem is not merely a differentiability statement, but rather a topological statement.

=== Connes–Donaldson–Sullivan–Teleman index theorem ===
Due to (Donaldson & Sullivan 1989), (Connes, Sullivan & Teleman 1994):

For any quasiconformal manifold there exists a local construction of the Hirzebruch–Thom characteristic classes.

This theory is based on a signature operator S, defined on middle degree differential forms on even-dimensional quasiconformal manifolds (compare (Donaldson & Sullivan 1989)).

Using topological cobordism and K-homology one may provide a full statement of an index theorem on quasiconformal manifolds (see page 678 of (Connes, Sullivan & Teleman 1994)). The work (Connes, Sullivan & Teleman 1994) "provides local constructions for characteristic classes based on higher dimensional relatives of the measurable Riemann mapping in dimension two and the Yang–Mills theory in dimension four."

These results constitute significant advances along the lines of Singer's program Prospects in Mathematics (Singer 1971). At the same time, they provide, also, an effective construction of the rational Pontrjagin classes on topological manifolds. The paper (Teleman 1985) provides a link between Thom's original construction of the rational Pontrjagin classes (Thom 1956) and index theory.

It is important to mention that the index formula is a topological statement. The obstruction theories due to Milnor, Kervaire, Kirby, Siebenmann, Sullivan, Donaldson show that only a minority of topological manifolds possess differentiable structures and these are not necessarily unique. Sullivan's result on Lipschitz and quasiconformal structures (Sullivan 1979) shows that any topological manifold in dimension different from 4 possesses such a structure which is unique (up to isotopy close to identity).

The quasiconformal structures (Connes, Sullivan & Teleman 1994) and more generally the L^{p}-structures, p > n(n+1)/2, introduced by M. Hilsum (Hilsum 1999), are the weakest analytical structures on topological manifolds of dimension n for which the index theorem is known to hold.

=== Other extensions ===
- The Atiyah–Singer theorem applies to elliptic pseudodifferential operators in much the same way as for elliptic differential operators. In fact, for technical reasons most of the early proofs worked with pseudodifferential rather than differential operators: their extra flexibility made some steps of the proofs easier.
- Instead of working with an elliptic operator between two vector bundles, it is sometimes more convenient to work with an elliptic complex
  $$0\rightarrow E_0 \rightarrow E_1 \rightarrow E_2 \rightarrow \dotsm \rightarrow E_m \rightarrow 0$$
  of vector bundles. The difference is that the symbols now form an exact sequence (off the zero section). In the case when there are just two non-zero bundles in the complex this implies that the symbol is an isomorphism off the zero section, so an elliptic complex with 2 terms is essentially the same as an elliptic operator between two vector bundles. Conversely the index theorem for an elliptic complex can easily be reduced to the case of an elliptic operator: the two vector bundles are given by the sums of the even or odd terms of the complex, and the elliptic operator is the sum of the operators of the elliptic complex and their adjoints, restricted to the sum of the even bundles.
- If the manifold is allowed to have boundary, then some restrictions must be put on the domain of the elliptic operator in order to ensure a finite index. These conditions can be local (like demanding that the sections in the domain vanish at the boundary) or more complicated global conditions (like requiring that the sections in the domain solve some differential equation). The local case was worked out by Atiyah and Bott, but they showed that many interesting operators (e.g., the signature operator) do not admit local boundary conditions. To handle these operators, Atiyah, Patodi and Singer introduced global boundary conditions equivalent to attaching a cylinder to the manifold along the boundary and then restricting the domain to those sections that are square integrable along the cylinder. This point of view is adopted in the proof of Melrose (1993) of the Atiyah–Patodi–Singer index theorem.
- Instead of just one elliptic operator, one can consider a family of elliptic operators parameterized by some space Y. In this case the index is an element of the K-theory of Y, rather than an integer. If the operators in the family are real, then the index lies in the real K-theory of Y. This gives a little extra information, as the map from the real K-theory of Y to the complex K-theory is not always injective.
- If there is a group action of a group G on the compact manifold X, commuting with the elliptic operator, then one replaces ordinary K-theory with equivariant K-theory. Moreover, one gets generalizations of the Lefschetz fixed-point theorem, with terms coming from fixed-point submanifolds of the group G. See also: equivariant index theorem.
- Atiyah (1976) showed how to extend the index theorem to some non-compact manifolds, acted on by a discrete group with compact quotient. The kernel of the elliptic operator is in general infinite dimensional in this case, but it is possible to get a finite index using the dimension of a module over a von Neumann algebra; this index is in general real rather than integer valued. This version is called the L^{2} index theorem, and was used by Atiyah & Schmid (1977) to rederive properties of the discrete series representations of semisimple Lie groups.
- The Callias index theorem is an index theorem for a Dirac operator on a noncompact odd-dimensional space. The Atiyah–Singer index is only defined on compact spaces, and vanishes when their dimension is odd. In 1978 Constantine Callias, at the suggestion of his Ph.D. advisor Roman Jackiw, used the axial anomaly to derive this index theorem on spaces equipped with a Hermitian matrix called the Higgs field. The index of the Dirac operator is a topological invariant which measures the winding of the Higgs field on a sphere at infinity. If U is the unit matrix in the direction of the Higgs field, then the index is proportional to the integral of U(dU)^{n−1} over the (n−1)-sphere at infinity. If n is even, it is always zero.
  - The topological interpretation of this invariant and its relation to the Hörmander index proposed by Boris Fedosov, as generalized by Lars Hörmander, was published by Raoul Bott and Robert Thomas Seeley.

== Examples ==
=== Chern-Gauss-Bonnet theorem ===
Suppose that $M$ is a compact oriented manifold of dimension $n = 2r$. If we take $\Lambda^\text{even}$ to be the sum of the even exterior powers of the cotangent bundle, and $\Lambda^\text{odd}$ to be the sum of the odd powers, define $D = d + d^*$, considered as a map from $\Lambda^\text{even}$ to $\Lambda^\text{odd}$. Then the analytical index of $D$ is the Euler characteristic $\chi (M)$ of the Hodge cohomology of $M$, and the topological index is the integral of the Euler class over the manifold. The index formula for this operator yields the Chern–Gauss–Bonnet theorem.

The concrete computation goes as follows: according to one variation of the splitting principle, if $E$ is a real vector bundle of dimension $n = 2r$, in order to prove assertions involving characteristic classes, we may suppose that there are complex line bundles $l_1,\, \ldots,\, l_r$ such that $E \otimes \mathbb{C} = l_1 \oplus \overline{l_1} \oplus \dotsm l_r \oplus \overline{l_r}$. Therefore, we can consider the Chern roots $x_i (E \otimes \mathbb{C}) = c_1(l_i)$, $x_{r+i} (E \otimes \mathbb{C}) = c_1\mathord\left(\overline{l_i}\right) = -x_i(E \otimes \mathbb{C})$, $i = 1,\, \ldots,\, r$.

Using Chern roots as above and the standard properties of the Euler class, we have that $e(TM) = \prod^r_i x_i(TM \otimes \mathbb{C})$. As for the Chern character and the Todd class,

$$\begin{align}
\operatorname{ch}\mathord\left(\Lambda^\text{even} - \Lambda^\text{odd}\right)
&= 1 - \operatorname{ch}(T^* M \otimes \mathbb{C}) + \operatorname{ch}\mathord\left(\Lambda^2 T^* M \otimes \mathbb{C}\right) - \ldots + (-1)^n \operatorname{ch}\mathord\left(\Lambda^n T^* M \otimes \mathbb{C}\right) \\
&= 1 - \sum_i^n e^{-x_i}(TM \otimes \mathbb{C}) + \sum_{i<j} e^{-x_i}e^{-x_j}(TM \otimes \mathbb{C}) + \ldots + (-1)^n e^{-x_1} \dotsm e^{-x_n}(TM \otimes \mathbb{C}) \\
&= \prod_i^n \left(1 - e^{-x_i}\right)(TM \otimes \mathbb{C}) \\[3pt]
\operatorname{Td}(TM \otimes \mathbb{C})
&= \prod_i^n \frac{x_i}{1 - e^{-x_i}} (TM \otimes \mathbb{C})
\end{align}$$

Applying the index theorem,

$$\chi(M) = (-1)^r \int_M \frac{\prod_{i}^n \left(1 - e^{-x_i}\right)}{\prod_i^r x_i} \prod_i^n \frac{x_i}{1 - e^{-x_i}}(TM \otimes \mathbb{C}) = (-1)^r \int_{M}(-1)^r\prod_i^r x_i(TM \otimes \mathbb{C}) = \int_M e(TM)$$

which is the "topological" version of the Chern-Gauss-Bonnet theorem (the geometric one being obtained by applying the Chern-Weil homomorphism).

=== Hirzebruch–Riemann–Roch theorem ===
Take X to be a complex manifold of (complex) dimension n with a holomorphic vector bundle V. We let the vector bundles E and F be the sums of the bundles of differential forms with coefficients in V of type (0, i) with i even or odd, and we let the differential operator D be the sum

$$\overline\partial + \overline\partial^*$$

restricted to E.

This derivation of the Hirzebruch–Riemann–Roch theorem is more natural if we use the index theorem for elliptic complexes rather than elliptic operators. We can take the complex to be

$$0 \rightarrow V \rightarrow V \otimes \Lambda^{0,1}T^*(X) \rightarrow V \otimes \Lambda^{0,2}T^*(X) \rightarrow \dotsm$$

with the differential given by $\overline\partial$. Then the i'th cohomology group is just the coherent cohomology group H^{i}(X, V), so the analytical index of this complex is the holomorphic Euler characteristic of V:

$$\operatorname{index}(D) = \sum_p (-1)^p \dim H^p(X, V) = \chi(X, V)$$

Since we are dealing with complex bundles, the computation of the topological index is simpler. Using Chern roots and doing similar computations as in the previous example, the Euler class is given by $e(TX) = \prod_{i}^{n}x_i(TX)$ and

$$\begin{align}
\operatorname{ch}\left(\sum_{j}^{n} (-1)^j V \otimes \Lambda^{j}\overline{T^*X}\right) &= \operatorname{ch}(V)\prod_{j}^{n}\left(1 - e^{x_j}\right)(TX) \\
\operatorname{Td}(TX \otimes \mathbb{C}) = \operatorname{Td}(TX)\operatorname{Td}\left(\overline{TX}\right) &= \prod_i^n\frac{x_i}{1 - e^{-x_i}} \prod_j^n\frac{-x_j}{1 - e^{x_j}}(TX)
\end{align}$$

Applying the index theorem, we obtain the Hirzebruch-Riemann-Roch theorem:

$$\chi(X, V)=\int _X \operatorname{ch}(V)\operatorname{Td}(TX)$$

In fact we get a generalization of it to all complex manifolds: Hirzebruch's proof only worked for projective complex manifolds X.

=== Hirzebruch signature theorem ===
The Hirzebruch signature theorem states that the signature of a compact oriented manifold X of dimension 4k is given by the L genus of the manifold. This follows from the Atiyah–Singer index theorem applied to the following signature operator.

The bundles E and F are given by the +1 and −1 eigenspaces of the operator on the bundle of differential forms of X, that acts on k-forms as $i^{k(k - 1)}$ times the Hodge star operator. The operator D is the Hodge Laplacian

$$D \equiv \Delta \mathrel{:=} \left(\mathbf{d} + \mathbf{d^*}\right)^2$$

restricted to E, where d is the Cartan exterior derivative and d* is its adjoint.

The analytic index of D is the signature of the manifold X, and its topological index is the L genus of X, so these are equal.

=== Â genus and Rochlin's theorem ===
The Â genus is a rational number defined for any manifold, but is in general not an integer. Borel and Hirzebruch showed that it is integer for spin manifolds, and an even integer if in addition the dimension is 4 mod 8. This can be deduced from the index theorem, which implies that the Â genus for spin manifolds is the index of a Dirac operator. The extra factor of 2 in dimensions 4 mod 8 comes from the fact that in this case the kernel and cokernel of the Dirac operator have a quaternionic structure, so as complex vector spaces they have even dimensions, so the index is even.

In dimension 4 this result implies Rochlin's theorem that the signature of a 4-dimensional spin manifold is divisible by 16: this follows because in dimension 4 the Â genus is minus one eighth of the signature.

== Proof techniques ==
=== Pseudodifferential operators ===
Pseudodifferential operators can be explained easily in the case of constant coefficient operators on Euclidean space. In this case, constant coefficient differential operators are just the Fourier transforms of multiplication by polynomials, and constant coefficient pseudodifferential operators are just the Fourier transforms of multiplication by more general functions.

Many proofs of the index theorem use pseudodifferential operators rather than differential operators. The reason for this is that for many purposes there are not enough differential operators. For example, a pseudoinverse of an elliptic differential operator of positive order is not a differential operator, but is a pseudodifferential operator. Also, there is a direct correspondence between data representing elements of K(B(X), S(X)) (clutching functions) and symbols of elliptic pseudodifferential operators.

Pseudodifferential operators have an order, which can be any real number or even −∞, and have symbols (which are no longer polynomials on the cotangent space), and elliptic differential operators are those whose symbols are invertible for sufficiently large cotangent vectors. Most versions of the index theorem can be extended from elliptic differential operators to elliptic pseudodifferential operators.

=== Cobordism ===
The initial proof was based on that of the Hirzebruch–Riemann–Roch theorem (1954), and involved cobordism theory and pseudodifferential operators.

The idea of this first proof is roughly as follows. Consider the ring generated by pairs (X, V) where V is a smooth vector bundle on the compact smooth oriented manifold X, with relations that the sum and product of the ring on these generators are given by disjoint union and product of manifolds (with the obvious operations on the vector bundles), and any boundary of a manifold with vector bundle is 0. This is similar to the cobordism ring of oriented manifolds, except that the manifolds also have a vector bundle. The topological and analytical indices are both reinterpreted as functions from this ring to the integers. Then one checks that these two functions are in fact both ring homomorphisms. In order to prove they are the same, it is then only necessary to check they are the same on a set of generators of this ring. Thom's cobordism theory gives a set of generators; for example, complex vector spaces with the trivial bundle together with certain bundles over even dimensional spheres. So the index theorem can be proved by checking it on these particularly simple cases.

=== K-theory ===
Atiyah and Singer's first published proof used K-theory rather than cobordism. If i is any inclusion of compact manifolds from X to Y, they defined a 'pushforward' operation i_{!} on elliptic operators of X to elliptic operators of Y that preserves the index. By taking Y to be some sphere that X embeds in, this reduces the index theorem to the case of spheres. If Y is a sphere and X is some point embedded in Y, then any elliptic operator on Y is the image under i_{!} of some elliptic operator on the point. This reduces the index theorem to the case of a point, where it is trivial.

=== Heat equation ===
Atiyah, Bott, and Patodi (1973) gave a new proof of the index theorem using the heat equation, see e.g. Berline, Getzler & Vergne (1992). The proof is also published in (Melrose 1993) and (Gilkey 1994).

If D is a differential operator with adjoint D*, then D*D and DD* are self adjoint operators whose non-zero eigenvalues have the same multiplicities. However their zero eigenspaces may have different multiplicities, as these multiplicities are the dimensions of the kernels of D and D*. Therefore, the index of D is given by

$$\operatorname{index}(D) = \dim \operatorname{Ker}(D) - \dim \operatorname{Ker}(D^*) = \dim \operatorname{Ker}(D^*D) - \dim \operatorname{Ker}(DD^*) = \operatorname{Tr}\left(e^{-t D^* D}\right) - \operatorname{Tr}\left(e^{-t DD^*}\right)$$

for any positive t. The right hand side is given by the trace of the difference of the kernels of two heat operators. These have an asymptotic expansion for small positive t, which can be used to evaluate the limit as t tends to 0, giving a proof of the Atiyah–Singer index theorem. The asymptotic expansions for small t appear very complicated, but invariant theory shows that there are huge cancellations between the terms, which makes it possible to find the leading terms explicitly. These cancellations were later explained using supersymmetry.

== See also ==
- (-1)F – Term in quantum field theory
- Witten index – Modified partition function
