= Vijay Kumar Patodi =

Indian mathematician (1945–1976)

- Born: 12 March 1945; Guna, British India (now Madhya Pradesh, India)
- Died: 21 December 1976 (aged 31); Bombay, Maharashtra
- Education: Benaras Hindu University; University of Bombay; Institute for Advanced Study
- Awards: Young Scientist Award
- Scientific career
- Doctoral advisor: M. S. Narasimhan; S. Ramanan

Vijay Kumar Patodi (12 March 1945 – 21 December 1976) was an Indian mathematician who made fundamental contributions to differential geometry and topology. He was the first mathematician to apply heat equation methods to the proof of the index theorem for elliptic operators. He was a professor at Tata Institute of Fundamental Research, Mumbai (Bombay).

== Education ==
Patodi was a graduate of Government High School, Guna, Madhya Pradesh. He received his bachelor's degree from Vikram University, Ujjain, his master's degree from the Benaras Hindu University, and his Ph.D. from the University of Bombay under the guidance of M. S. Narasimhan and S. Ramanan at the Tata Institute of Fundamental Research.

In the two papers based on his Ph.D. thesis, "Curvature and Eigenforms of the Laplace Operator" (Journal of Differential Geometry), and "An Analytical Proof of the Riemann-Roch-Hirzebruch Formula for Kaehler Manifolds" (also Journal of Differential Geometry), Patodi made his fundamental breakthroughs.

== Research career ==
He was invited to spend 1971–1973 at the Institute for Advanced Study in Princeton, New Jersey, where he collaborated with Michael Atiyah, Isadore Singer, and Raoul Bott. The joint work led to a series of papers, "Spectral Asymmetry and Riemannian Geometry" with Atiyah and Singer, in which the η-invariant was defined. This invariant was to play a major role in subsequent advances in the area in the 1980s.

Patodi was promoted to full professor at Tata Institute at age 30, however, he died at age 31, as a result of complications prior to surgery for a kidney transplant.
