= Robert Thomas Seeley =

American mathematician (1932–2016)

Robert Thomas Seeley (February 26, 1932 – November 30, 2016) was an American mathematician who worked on pseudo differential operators and the heat equation approach to the Atiyah–Singer index theorem.

== Life and career ==
Seeley was born in Bryn Mawr, Pennsylvania on February 26, 1932. He did his undergraduate studies at Haverford College, and earned his Ph.D. from the Massachusetts Institute of Technology in 1959, under the supervision of Alberto Pedro Calderón. He taught at Harvey Mudd College and then in 1962 joined the faculty of Brandeis University. In 1972 he moved to the University of Massachusetts Boston; he retired as an emeritus professor. In 2012 he became a fellow of the American Mathematical Society.

Seeley died in Newton, Massachusetts on November 30, 2016, at the age of 84.
