= Genus of a multiplicative sequence =

Ring homomorphism from the cobordism ring of manifolds to another ring

A cobordism (W; M, N).

In mathematics, a genus of a multiplicative sequence is a ring homomorphism from the ring of smooth compact manifolds up to the equivalence of bounding a smooth manifold with boundary (i.e., up to suitable cobordism) to another ring, usually the rational numbers, having the property that they are constructed from a sequence of polynomials in characteristic classes that arise as coefficients in formal power series with good multiplicative properties.

== Definition ==
A genus $\varphi$ assigns a number $\Phi(X)$ to each manifold X such that

1. $\Phi(X \sqcup Y) = \Phi(X) + \Phi(Y)$ (where $\sqcup$ is the disjoint union);
2. $\Phi(X \times Y) = \Phi(X)\Phi(Y)$;
3. $\Phi(X) = 0$ if X is the boundary of a manifold with boundary.

The manifolds and manifolds with boundary may be required to have additional structure; for example, they might be oriented, spin, stably complex, and so on (see list of cobordism theories for many more examples). The value $\Phi(X)$ is in some ring, often the ring of rational numbers, though it can be other rings such as $\Z/2\Z$ or the ring of modular forms.

The conditions on $\Phi$ can be rephrased as saying that $\Phi$ is a ring homomorphism from the cobordism ring of manifolds (with additional structure) to another ring.

Example: If $\Phi(X)$ is the signature of the oriented manifold X, then $\Phi$ is a genus from oriented manifolds to the ring of integers.

== The genus associated to a formal power series ==
A sequence of polynomials $K_1, K_2,\ldots$ in variables $p_1, p_2,\ldots$ is called multiplicative if

$$1 + p_1z + p_2z^2 + \cdots = (1 + q_1z + q_2z^2 + \cdots) (1 + r_1z + r_2z^2 + \cdots)$$

implies that

$$\sum_j K_j(p_1, p_2, \ldots)z^j = \sum_j K_j (q_1, q_2, \ldots) z^j\sum_k K_k (r_1, r_2, \ldots)z^k$$

If $Q(z)$ is a formal power series in z with constant term 1, we can define a multiplicative sequence

$$K = 1+ K_1 + K_2 + \cdots$$

by

$$K(p_1, p_2, p_3, \ldots) = Q(z_1)Q(z_2)Q(z_3)\cdots$$,

where $p_k$ is the kth elementary symmetric function of the indeterminates $z_i$. (The variables $p_k$ will often in practice be Pontryagin classes.)

The genus $\Phi$ of compact, connected, smooth, oriented manifolds corresponding to Q is given by

$$\Phi(X) = K(p_1, p_2, p_3, \ldots)$$

where the $p_k$ are the Pontryagin classes of X. The power series Q is called the characteristic power series of the genus $\Phi$. A theorem of René Thom, which states that the rationals tensored with the cobordism ring is a polynomial algebra in generators of degree 4k for positive integers k, implies that this gives a bijection between formal power series Q with rational coefficients and leading coefficient 1, and genera from oriented manifolds to the rational numbers.

== L genus ==
The L genus is the genus of the formal power series

$${\sqrt{z}\over \tanh(\sqrt z)} = \sum_{k\ge 0} \frac{2^{2k}B_{2k}z^k}{(2k)!} = 1 + {z \over 3} - {z^2 \over 45} + \cdots$$

where the numbers $B_{2k}$ are the Bernoulli numbers. The first few values are:

$$\begin{align}
L_0 &= 1 \\
L_1 &= \tfrac13 p_1 \\
L_2 &= \tfrac1{45}\left(7p_2 - p_1^2\right) \\
L_3 &= \tfrac1{945}\left(62 p_3 - 13 p_1 p_2 + 2 p_1^3\right) \\
L_4 &= \tfrac1{14175}\left(381 p_4 - 71 p_1 p_3 - 19 p_2^2 + 22 p_1^2 p_2 - 3 p_1^4\right)
\end{align}$$

(for further L-polynomials see or OEIS: A237111). Now let M be a closed smooth oriented manifold of dimension 4n with Pontrjagin classes $p_i = p_i(M)$. Friedrich Hirzebruch showed that the L genus of M in dimension 4n evaluated on the fundamental class of $M$, denoted $[M]$, is equal to $\sigma(M)$, the signature of M (i.e., the signature of the intersection form on the 2nth cohomology group of M):

$$\sigma(M) = \langle L_n(p_1(M), \ldots, p_n(M)), [M]\rangle$$.

This is now known as the Hirzebruch signature theorem (or sometimes the Hirzebruch index theorem).

The fact that $L_2$ is always integral for a smooth manifold was used by John Milnor to give an example of an 8-dimensional piecewise linear (PL) manifold with no smooth structure. Pontryagin numbers can also be defined for PL manifolds, and Milnor showed that his PL manifold had a non-integral value of $p_2$, and so was not smoothable.

=== Application on K3 surfaces ===
Since projective K3 surfaces are smooth complex manifolds of dimension two, their only non-trivial Pontryagin class is $p_1$ in $H^4(X)$. It can be computed as -48 using the tangent sequence and comparisons with complex Chern classes. Since $L_1 = -16$, we have its signature. This can be used to compute its intersection form as a unimodular lattice since it has $\operatorname{dim}\left(H^2(X)\right) = 22$, and using the classification of unimodular lattices.

== Todd genus ==
The Todd genus is the genus of the formal power series

$$\frac{z}{1 - \exp(-z)} = \sum_{i=0}^\infty\frac{B_i}{i!}z^i$$

with $B_i$ as before, Bernoulli numbers. The first few values are

$$\begin{align}
Td_0 &= 1 \\
Td_1 &= \frac1{2} c_1 \\
Td_2 &= \frac1{12} \left (c_2 + c_1^2 \right ) \\
Td_3 &= \frac1{24} c_1 c_2 \\
Td_4 &= \frac1{720} \left(-c_1^4 + 4 c_2 c_1^2 + 3c_2^2 + c_3 c_1 - c_4\right)
\end{align}$$

The Todd genus has the particular property that it assigns the value 1 to all complex projective spaces (i.e. $\mathrm{Td}_n(\mathbb{CP}^n) = 1$), and this suffices to show that the Todd genus agrees with the arithmetic genus for algebraic varieties as the arithmetic genus is also 1 for complex projective spaces. This observation is a consequence of the Hirzebruch–Riemann–Roch theorem, and in fact is one of the key developments that led to the formulation of that theorem.

== Â genus ==
The Â genus is the genus associated to the characteristic power series

$$Q(z) = \frac{\frac{1}{2}\sqrt{z}}{\sinh\left(\frac{1}{2}\sqrt{z}\right)}
= 1 - \frac{z}{24} + \frac{7z^2}{5760} - \cdots$$

(There is also an A genus which is less commonly used, associated to the characteristic series $Q(16z)$.) The first few values are

$$\begin{align}
\hat{A}_0 &=  1 \\
\hat{A}_1 &= -\tfrac1{24}p_1 \\
\hat{A}_2 &=  \tfrac1{5760}\left(-4p_2 + 7 p_1^2\right) \\
\hat{A}_3 &=  \tfrac1{967680}\left(-16p_3 + 44p_2 p_1 - 31 p_1^3\right) \\
\hat{A}_4 &=  \tfrac1{464486400}\left(-192p_4 + 512 p_3 p_1 + 208p_2^2 - 904p_2 p_1^2 + 381p_1^4\right)
\end{align}$$

The Â genus of a spin manifold is an integer, and an even integer if the dimension is 4 mod 8 (which in dimension 4 implies Rochlin's theorem) – for general manifolds, the Â genus is not always an integer. This was proven by Hirzebruch and Armand Borel; this result both motivated and was later explained by the Atiyah–Singer index theorem, which showed that the Â genus of a spin manifold is equal to the index of its Dirac operator.

By combining this index result with a Weitzenbock formula for the Dirac Laplacian, André Lichnerowicz deduced that if a compact spin manifold admits a metric with positive scalar curvature, its Â genus must vanish. This only gives an obstruction to positive scalar curvature when the dimension is a multiple of 4, but Nigel Hitchin later discovered an analogous $\Z_2$-valued obstruction in dimensions 1 or 2 mod 8. These results are essentially sharp. Indeed, Mikhail Gromov, H. Blaine Lawson, and Stephan Stolz later proved that the Â genus and Hitchin's $\Z_2$-valued analog are the only obstructions to the existence of positive-scalar-curvature metrics on simply-connected spin manifolds of dimension greater than or equal to 5.

== Elliptic genus ==
A genus is called an elliptic genus if the power series $Q(z) = z/f(z)$ satisfies the condition

$${f'}^2 = 1 - 2\delta f^2 + \epsilon f^4$$

for constants $\delta$ and $\epsilon$. (As usual, Q is the characteristic power series of the genus.)

One explicit expression for f(z) is

$$f(z) = \frac{1}{a}\operatorname{sn}\left( az, \frac{\sqrt{\epsilon}}{a^2} \right)$$

where

$$a = \sqrt{\delta + \sqrt{\delta^2 - \epsilon}}$$

and sn is the Jacobi elliptic function.

Examples:

- $\delta = \epsilon = 1, f(z) = \tanh(z)$. This is the L-genus.
- $\delta = -\frac{1}{8}, \epsilon = 0, f(z) = 2\sinh\left(\frac{1}{2}z\right)$. This is the Â genus.
- $\epsilon = \delta^2 , f(z) = \frac{\tanh(\sqrt{\delta}z)}{\sqrt{\delta}}$. This is a generalization of the L-genus.

The first few values of such genera are:

$$\frac{1}{3}\delta p_1$$
$$\frac{1}{90} \left [ \left (-4\delta^2 +18\epsilon \right )p_2+ \left (7\delta^2-9\epsilon \right )p_1^2\right ]$$
$$\frac{1}{1890} \left [ \left (16\delta^3 + 108\delta \epsilon \right )p_3 + \left (-44\delta^3 +18\delta \epsilon \right )p_2p_1 + \left (31\delta^3 -27\delta \epsilon \right )p_1^3\right ]$$

Example (elliptic genus for quaternionic projective plane) :

$$\begin{align}
\Phi_{ell}(HP^2) &= \int_{HP^2}\tfrac1{90}\big[(-4\delta^2 +18\epsilon )p_2+(7\delta^2-9\epsilon )p_1^2\big] \\
&= \int_{HP^2}\tfrac1{90}\big[(-4\delta^2 +18\epsilon )(7u^2)+(7\delta^2-9\epsilon )(2u)^2\big] \\
&= \int_{HP^2} [u^2 \epsilon ] \\
&= \epsilon \int_{HP^2} [u^2] \\
&= \epsilon * 1 = \epsilon
\end{align}$$

Example (elliptic genus for octonionic projective plane, or Cayley plane):

$$\begin{align}
\Phi_{ell}(OP^2) &= \int_{OP^2}\tfrac1{113400} \left[(-192\delta^4 + 1728\delta^2\epsilon + 1512\epsilon^2)p_4 + (208\delta^4 - 1872\delta^2\epsilon + 1512\epsilon^2)p_2^2\right] \\
&= \int_{OP^2}\tfrac1{113400}\big[(-192\delta^4 + 1728\delta^2\epsilon + 1512\epsilon^2)(39u^2) + (208\delta^4 - 1872\delta^2\epsilon + 1512\epsilon^2)(6u)^2\big] \\
&= \int_{OP^2}\big[ \epsilon^2 u^2 \big] \\
&= \epsilon^2\int_{OP^2} \big[ u^2 \big] \\
&= \epsilon^2* 1 = \epsilon^2 \\
&= \Phi_{ell}(HP^2) ^2
\end{align}$$

== Witten genus ==
The Witten genus is the genus associated to the characteristic power series

$$Q(z) = \frac{z}{\sigma_L(z)} = \exp\left(\sum_{k\ge 2} {2G_{2k}(\tau)z^{2k}\over(2k)!}\right)$$

where σ_{L} is the Weierstrass sigma function for the lattice L, and G is a multiple of an Eisenstein series.

The Witten genus of a 4k dimensional compact oriented smooth spin manifold with vanishing first Pontryagin class is a modular form of weight 2k, with integral Fourier coefficients.

== See also ==
- Atiyah–Singer index theorem
- List of cohomology theories
