= Hirzebruch signature theorem =

Gives the signature of a smooth compact oriented manifold in terms of Pontryagin numbers

In differential topology, an area of mathematics, the Hirzebruch signature theorem (sometimes called the Hirzebruch index theorem) is Friedrich Hirzebruch's 1954 result expressing the signature of a smooth closed oriented manifold by a linear combination of Pontryagin numbers called the L-genus. It was used in the proof of the Hirzebruch–Riemann–Roch theorem.

== Statement of the theorem ==
The L-genus is the genus for the multiplicative sequence of polynomials associated to the characteristic power series

$${x\over \tanh(x)} = \sum_{k\ge 0} {{2^{2k}B_{2k}\over (2k)!}x^{2k}}
= 1 + {x^2 \over 3} - {x^4 \over 45} +\cdots .$$

The first two of the resulting L-polynomials are:

- $L_1 = \tfrac13 p_1$
- $L_2 = \tfrac1{45}(7p_2 - p_1^2)$

(for further L-polynomials see or OEIS: A237111).

By taking for the $p_i$ the Pontryagin classes $p_i(M)$ of the tangent bundle of a 4n dimensional smooth closed oriented manifold M one obtains the L-classes of M. Hirzebruch showed that the n-th L-class of M evaluated on the fundamental class of M, $[M]$, is equal to $\sigma(M)$, the signature of M (i.e. the signature of the intersection form on the 2nth cohomology group of M):

$$\sigma(M) = \langle L_n(p_1(M), \dots, p_n(M)), [M]\rangle.$$

== Sketch of proof of the signature theorem ==
René Thom had earlier proved that the signature was given by some linear combination of Pontryagin numbers, and Hirzebruch found the exact formula for this linear combination by introducing the notion of the genus of a multiplicative sequence.

Since the rational oriented cobordism ring $\Omega_*^{\text{SO}}\otimes \Q$ is equal to

$$\Omega_*^{\text{SO}}\otimes \Q =\Q [\mathbb{P}^{2}(\Complex), \mathbb{P}^{4}(\Complex), \ldots ],$$

the polynomial algebra generated by the oriented cobordism classes $[\mathbb{P}^{2i}(\Complex)]$ of the even dimensional complex projective spaces, it is enough to verify that

$$\sigma(\mathbb{P}^{2i})= 1 = \langle L_i(p_1(\mathbb{P}^{2i}), \ldots, p_n(\mathbb{P}^{2i})), [\mathbb{P}^{2i}]\rangle$$

for all i.

== Generalizations ==
The signature theorem is a special case of the Atiyah–Singer index theorem for the signature operator. The analytic index of the signature operator equals the signature of the manifold, and its topological index is the L-genus of the manifold. By the Atiyah–Singer index theorem these are equal.

== Sources ==
- F. Hirzebruch, The Signature Theorem. Reminiscences and recreation. Prospects in Mathematics, Annals of Mathematics Studies, Band 70, 1971, S. 3–31.
- Milnor, John W.; Stasheff, James D. (1974). Characteristic Classes. Annals of Mathematics Studies. Princeton University Press; University of Tokyo Press. ISBN 0-691-08122-0.
