= Pontryagin class =

Characteristic class for real vector bundles

In mathematics, the Pontryagin classes, named after Lev Pontryagin, are certain characteristic classes of real vector bundles. The Pontryagin classes lie in cohomology groups with degrees a multiple of four.

== Definition ==
Given a real vector bundle $E$ over $M$, its $k$-th Pontryagin class $p_k(E)$ is defined as

$$p_k(E) = p_k(E, \Z) = (-1)^k c_{2k}(E\otimes \Complex) \in  H^{4k}(M, \Z),$$

where:

- $c_{2k}(E\otimes \Complex)$ denotes the $2k$-th Chern class of the complexification $E\otimes \Complex = E\oplus iE$ of $E$,
- $H^{4k}(M, \Z)$ is the $4k$-cohomology group of $M$ with integer coefficients.

The rational Pontryagin class $p_k(E, \Q)$ is defined to be the image of $p_k(E)$ in $H^{4k}(M, \Q)$, the $4k$-cohomology group of $M$ with rational coefficients.

== Axiomatic characterization and relation to Chern classes ==
Beyond the definition via Chern classes given above, Pontryagin classes can also be characterized by a set of axioms that uniquely determine them, in analogy with the Stiefel–Whitney and Chern class axioms.

Pontryagin classes can be characterized axiomatically, in parallel with the axioms for Stiefel–Whitney classes and Chern classes. For each real vector bundle E → B, the Pontryagin classes p_{k}(E) ∈ H^{4k}(B; Z) are uniquely determined by the following properties:

1. Naturality: For a continuous map f: B′ → B, p_{k}(f^{*}E) = f^{*}p_{k}(E).
2. Whitney sum formula: p(E ⊕ F) = p(E) ⌣ p(F), where p = 1 + p_{1} + p_{2} + ⋯ is the total Pontryagin class.
3. Normalization: For the tautological line bundle γ^{1} → RP^{∞}, the Pontryagin class vanishes: p(γ^{1}) = 1.

These three properties are sufficient to pin down the Pontryagin classes uniquely, so they can be used as an alternative definition that avoids choosing a specific complexification.

The third axiom reflects that real line bundles have no nontrivial Pontryagin classes; their characteristic classes are detected by the first Stiefel–Whitney class w_{1}. For real bundles of rank 2, however, p_{1} may be nonzero.

The most computationally useful relation connects Pontryagin classes to Chern classes via complexification. Let E be a complex vector bundle over B, and let E_{R} denote the underlying real bundle. Then the k-th Pontryagin class of E_{R} is given by

$$p_k(E_{\mathbf R}) = (-1)^k c_{2k}(E \otimes_{\mathbf R} \mathbf C),$$

where c_{2k} is the 2k-th Chern class of the complexification of E. In particular, the odd Chern classes of E ⊗ C vanish, so the Pontryagin classes capture only the even-degree Chern data. This formula is fundamental because it reduces computations of Pontryagin classes to those of Chern classes, which are often easier to handle.

For a rank-2 complex bundle E, this yields the low-degree formula p_{1}(E_{R}) = −c_{2}(E ⊗ C) = c_{1}(E)^{2} − 2c_{2}(E) in real cohomology. This identity is frequently used to compute Pontryagin numbers of almost complex manifolds. Beyond these low degree computations, the axioms also imply two structural properties that are important in applications.

The axiom set above also implies that Pontryagin classes are stable: adding a trivial real bundle does not change p(E). Consequently, Pontryagin classes define characteristic classes for real K-theory, living in the even cohomology of the classifying space BO. The splitting principle allows the computation of p(E) by pulling back to a flag bundle where E decomposes as a sum of line bundles, reducing the Whitney formula to a product over the roots.

== Properties ==
The total Pontryagin class

$$p(E)=1+p_1(E)+p_2(E)+\cdots\in H^*(M,\Z),$$

is (modulo 2-torsion) multiplicative with respect to Whitney sum of vector bundles, i.e.,

$$2p(E\oplus F)=2p(E)\smile p(F)$$

for two vector bundles $E$ and $F$ over $M$. In terms of the individual Pontryagin classes $p_k$,

$$2p_1(E\oplus F)=2p_1(E)+2p_1(F),$$
$$2p_2(E\oplus F)=2p_2(E)+2p_1(E)\smile p_1(F)+2p_2(F)$$

and so on.

The vanishing of the Pontryagin classes and Stiefel–Whitney classes of a vector bundle does not guarantee that the vector bundle is trivial. For example, up to vector bundle isomorphism, there is a unique nontrivial rank 10 vector bundle $E_{10}$ over the 9-sphere. (The clutching function for $E_{10}$ arises from the homotopy group $\pi_8(\mathrm{O}(10)) = \Z/2\Z$.) The Pontryagin classes and Stiefel-Whitney classes all vanish: the Pontryagin classes don't exist in degree 9, and the Stiefel–Whitney class $w_9$ of $E_{10}$ vanishes by the Wu formula $w_9 = w_1 w_8 + Sq^1(w_8)$. Moreover, this vector bundle is stably nontrivial, i.e. the Whitney sum of $E_{10}$ with any trivial bundle remains nontrivial. (Hatcher 2009, p. 76)

Given a $2 k$-dimensional vector bundle $E$ we have

$$p_k(E)=e(E)\smile e(E),$$

where $e(E)$ denotes the Euler class of $E$, and $\smile$ denotes the cup product of cohomology classes.

=== Pontryagin classes and curvature ===
As was shown by Shiing-Shen Chern and André Weil around 1948, the rational Pontryagin classes

$$p_k(E,\mathbf{Q})\in H^{4k}(M,\mathbf{Q})$$

can be presented as differential forms which depend polynomially on the curvature form of a vector bundle. This Chern–Weil theory revealed a major connection between algebraic topology and global differential geometry.

For a vector bundle $E$ over a $n$-dimensional differentiable manifold $M$ equipped with a connection, the total Pontryagin class is expressed as

$$p=\left[1-\frac{{\rm Tr}(\Omega ^2)}{8 \pi ^2}+\frac{{\rm Tr}(\Omega ^2)^2-2 {\rm Tr}(\Omega ^4)}{128 \pi ^4}-\frac{{\rm Tr}(\Omega ^2)^3-6 {\rm Tr}(\Omega ^2) {\rm Tr}(\Omega ^4)+8 {\rm Tr}(\Omega ^6)}{3072 \pi ^6}+\cdots\right]\in H^*_{dR}(M),$$

where $\Omega$ denotes the curvature form, and $H^*_{dR} (M)$ denotes the de Rham cohomology groups.

=== Pontryagin classes of a manifold ===
The Pontryagin classes of a smooth manifold are defined to be the Pontryagin classes of its tangent bundle.

Novikov proved in 1966 that if two compact, oriented, smooth manifolds are homeomorphic then their rational Pontryagin classes $p_k(M, \mathbf{Q})$ in $H^{4k}(M, \mathbf{Q})$ are the same. If the dimension is at least five, there are at most finitely many different smooth manifolds with given homotopy type and Pontryagin classes.

=== Pontryagin classes from Chern classes ===
The Pontryagin classes of a complex vector bundle $\pi\colon E \to X$ are completely determined by its Chern classes. This follows from the fact that $E\otimes_{\mathbb{R}}\mathbb{C} \cong E\oplus \bar{E}$, the Whitney sum formula, and properties of Chern classes of its complex conjugate bundle. That is, $c_i(\bar{E}) = (-1)^ic_i(E)$ and $c(E\oplus\bar{E}) = c(E)c(\bar{E})$. Then, given this relation, we can see

$1 - p_1(E) + p_2(E) - \cdots + (-1)^np_n(E) = (1 + c_1(E) + \cdots + c_n(E)) \cdot (1 - c_1(E) + c_2(E) -\cdots + (-1)^nc_n(E))$.

For example, we can apply this formula to find the Pontryagin classes of a complex vector bundle on a curve and a surface. For a curve, we have

$(1-c_1(E))(1 + c_1(E)) = 1 + c_1(E)^2$

so all of the Pontryagin classes of complex vector bundles are trivial. In general, looking at first two terms of the product

$(1-c_1(E) + c_2(E) + \ldots + (-1)^n c_n(E))(1 + c_1(E) + c_2(E) +\ldots + c_n(E)) = 1 - c_1(E)^2 + 2c_2(E) + \ldots$

we can see that $p_1(E) = c_1(E)^2 - 2c_2(E)$. In particular, for line bundles this simplifies further since $c_2(L) = 0$ by dimension reasons.

=== Pontryagin classes on a quartic K3 surface ===
Recall that a quartic polynomial whose vanishing locus in $\mathbb{CP}^3$ is a smooth subvariety is a K3 surface. If we use the normal sequence

$$0 \to \mathcal{T}_X \to \mathcal{T}_{\mathbb{CP}^3}|_X \to \mathcal{O}(4) \to 0$$

we can find

$$\begin{align}
c(\mathcal{T}_X) &= \frac{c(\mathcal{T}_{\mathbb{CP}^3}|_X)}{c(\mathcal{O}(4))} \\
&= \frac{(1+[H])^4}{(1+4[H])} \\
&= (1 + 4[H] + 6[H]^2)\cdot(1 - 4[H] + 16[H]^2) \\
&= 1 + 6[H]^2
\end{align}$$

showing $c_1(X) = 0$ and $c_2(X) = 6[H]^2$. Since $[H]^2$ corresponds to four points, due to Bézout's lemma, we have the second chern number as $24$. Since $p_1(X) = -2c_2(X)$ in this case, we have $p_1(X) = -48$. This number can be used to compute the third stable homotopy group of spheres.

== Pontryagin numbers ==
Pontryagin numbers are certain topological invariants of a smooth manifold. Each Pontryagin number of a manifold $M$ vanishes if the dimension of $M$ is not divisible by 4. It is defined in terms of the Pontryagin classes of the manifold $M$ as follows:

Given a smooth $4 n$-dimensional manifold $M$ and a collection of natural numbers

$k_1, k_2, \ldots , k_m$ such that $k_1+k_2+\cdots +k_m =n$,

the Pontryagin number $P_{k_1,k_2,\dots,k_m}$ is defined by

$$P_{k_1,k_2,\dots, k_m}=p_{k_1}\smile p_{k_2}\smile \cdots\smile p_{k_m}([M])$$

where $p_k$ denotes the $k$-th Pontryagin class and $[M]$ the fundamental class of $M$.

=== Properties ===
1. Pontryagin numbers are oriented cobordism invariant; and together with Stiefel-Whitney numbers they determine an oriented manifold's oriented cobordism class.
2. Pontryagin numbers of closed Riemannian manifolds (as well as Pontryagin classes) can be calculated as integrals of certain polynomials from the curvature tensor of a Riemannian manifold.
3. Invariants such as signature and $\hat A$-genus can be expressed through Pontryagin numbers. For the theorem describing the linear combination of Pontryagin numbers giving the signature see Hirzebruch signature theorem.

== Generalizations ==
There is also a quaternionic Pontryagin class, for vector bundles with quaternion structure.

== See also ==
- Chern–Simons form
- Hirzebruch signature theorem
