= Dima Von-Der-Flaass =

Russian mathematician and educator (1962–2010)

Dmitry Germanovich von der Flaass
- Дмитрий Германович Фон-дер-Флаасс
- Born: 8 September 1962
- Died: 10 June 2010 (aged 47)
- Citizenship: Soviet Union, Russia
- Education: Novosibirsk State University
- Known for: Cameron–Fon-Der-Flaass IBIS theorem
- Scientific career
- Fields: Mathematics, Education
- Workplaces: Sobolev Institute of Mathematics
- Thesis: (1986)
- Academic advisors: Victor Mazurov
- Website: flaass.livejournal.com

D. G. Von Der Flaass (September 8, 1962 – June 10, 2010) was a Russian mathematician and educator, Candidate of Physical and Mathematical Sciences, senior researcher at the Sobolev Institute of Mathematics. He was a specialist in combinatorics, a popularizer of mathematics, and an author of International Mathematical Olympiad problems. He was also a jury member for numerous mathematical olympiads. He had an Erdős number of 1.

== Biography ==
=== Early years ===
D. G. von der Flaass was born in the city of Krasnokamsk, Perm Krai on September 8, 1962, into the family of Herman Sergeevich von der Flaass, a Doctor of Geological and Mineralogical Sciences and a professor. The von der Flaass family lineage traces back to an officer in Napoleon's army, a Dutchman by origin, who was taken prisoner and remained in Russia.

In 1975, at the age of 13 (two years earlier than usual), Von Der Flaass was admitted to the Lavrentiev Physics and Mathematics School. He actively participated in school mathematics olympiads, consistently winning prizes in the Soviet Student Olympiads. He was a member of the USSR school team at the XIX International Mathematical Olympiad in Belgrade, where he won a bronze medal, despite being 3–4 years younger than his competitors.

After graduating from school, Von-der-Flaass remained in Novosibirsk, where he studied, lived, and worked for almost his entire life. At the age of 15, he enrolled in the Faculty of Mechanics and Mathematics at Novosibirsk State University (NSU). He was an excellent student and actively participated in and won Olympiads held within the framework of the All-Union Conferences "Student and Scientific-Technical Progress."

He specialized in the Department of Algebra and Mathematical Logic, where, under the supervision of Professor V. D. Mazurov, he researched finite groups. He defended his diploma on this topic, entered the postgraduate program at NSU, and in 1986 (at the age of 23), defended his Candidate's dissertation on maximal subgroups of finite simple groups. The results of his dissertation attracted great interest from specialists and significantly contributed to the classification of finite simple groups at that time. According to his scientific advisor, even while writing his Candidate’s dissertation, Von-der-Flaass showed a clear inclination toward elegant and ingenious combinatorial constructions.

Von der Flaass taught for several years in the United States and the United Kingdom but later returned to Russia, stating that the only place where he could feel comfortable was Akademgorodok.

== Scientific work ==
Von der Flaass specialized in combinatorics as a research fellow at the Sobolev Institute of Mathematics. His main interests lay in graph theory and coding theory. Over 25 years of work, he published a significant number of research papers, and in the last 10 years, his results were recognized four times as among the most important in the institute’s annual reports.

As a result, Von der Flaass became a well-known specialist in his field. However, the diversity and versatility of his creative nature prevented him from formalizing a doctoral dissertation based on his many published results. Only under years of pressure from his superiors and with technical support from colleagues at the institute did he prepare his doctoral dissertation, "The Algebraic Method in Combinatorial Problems." It successfully passed all levels of evaluation and was even listed in the Higher Attestation Commission bulletin. However, it was ultimately never defended, as the candidate was unwilling to spend a few more days on it.

Even while terminally ill, Von der Flaass remained deeply engaged in science. In his last three months, he wrote three papers and conceived another, continued solving and discussing Olympiad problems, corresponded with colleagues, and searched the internet for old but important works in group theory, algebra, and combinatorics, attempting to uncover their underlying philosophical depth.

Dmitry Germanovich von der Flaass died from esophageal cancer on June 10, 2010.

In 2012, a collection of memoirs about him was published. A posthumous publication of his doctoral dissertation was also planned.

== Olympiad and teaching activities ==
Alongside successful professional work in "pure mathematics," activity in the field of mathematical olympiads for school and university students was a significant and inseparable part of the life of D. G. von der Flaass. From the mid-1980s to 2009, with some interruptions, von der Flaass was a member of the Central Subject Methodological Commission, a jury member for the Soviet Student Olympiads, and later the All-Russian Mathematical Olympiad for school students, as well as a coach of the Russian national school team at the International Mathematical Olympiad. For several years, he was also a coach of the national teams of the United Kingdom, Kazakhstan, and Yakutia, achieving notable success everywhere.

The teaching talents of von der Flaass manifested in his work with gifted children, which he carried out with high quality and liveliness, without immersing himself in routine. He presented mathematics to students as a collection of beautiful and highly general ideas, realized in various ways, and then taught them to recognize and use these ideas without offering ready-made methods for solving problems.

Von der Flaass also participated in the work of the Methodological Commission on problem creation for mathematical olympiads. Many olympiad problems by von der Flaass stemmed from his professional activity or were related to it, but they were always of very high quality and interest, typically among the most challenging at the olympiads.

Bringing scientific results to a form understandable and accessible even to school students attracted von der Flaass the most. On this note, he concluded his activity by achieving a new mathematical result and transforming it into a problem for the final round of the 2010 All-Russian Mathematical Olympiad.

== Selected publications ==
- P. Erdős, D. G. von der Flaass, A. V. Kostochka, Zs. Tuza (1992). "Small transversals in uniform hypergraphs". Siberian Adv. Math. (in undetermined language). 2: 82–88.
- M. Alekseev, D. Barsky, A. Vorobey, G. Merzon, Yu. Prokopchuk, D. von der Flaass (2004). "On a problem of sequential decoding" (PDF). Proceedings of the XV International School-Seminar "Synthesis and Complexity of Control Systems": 5–8.
- D. G. von der Flaass (2010). "Extending pairings to Hamiltonian cycles" (PDF). Siberian Electronic Mathematical Reports. 7: 115–118.
- D. G. von der Flaass (2010). "The Sophist Gorgias' Theorems and Modern Mathematics". Kvant (5).
- Publications of D. G. von der Flaass on Mathnet.ru
- Olympiad problems by D. G. von der Flaass on Problems.ru
