= Alexander Buchan (mathematician) =

(1904–1976) Scottish mathematician

Alexander Fairley Buchan
- Born: 1904; Edinburgh, Scotland
- Died: 10 January 1976 (aged 71–72); Edinburgh, Scotland
- Education: University of Edinburgh
- Scientific career
- Thesis: Linear Combination of Data with Least Error of Differences (1939)
- Doctoral advisor: Alexander Aitken

Alexander Fairley Buchan MBE FRSE (1904 – 10 January 1976) was a Scottish mathematician. Most of his career was spent as a lecturer or teacher in mathematics. He completed his PhD in mathematics in 1939 with a thesis entitled, "Linear Combination of Data with Least Error of Differences". Buchan was awarded an MBE for his work as part of the emergency scheme for training of teachers in India. From 1940, he was a Fellow of the Royal Society of Edinburgh.

== Early life and career ==
Buchan was born in Edinburgh, Scotland in 1904. He attended Sciennes School, Edinburg in 1916 then George Heriot's School from 1916 to 1922, where he obtained high level passes in English, Mathematics, German, Science, and Dynamics. He attended the University of Edinburgh from 1922 to 1926, and was awarded a BSc (first class).

Buchan went on to become a mathematics teacher at James Gillespie's High School, Edinburgh until 1930 when he joined the Royal High School, Edinburgh. In 1935 he moved to James Gillespie's High School for Girls as principal teacher of mathematics. His final posting was as principal lecturer in mathematics at Moray House College of Education. In 1941 he co-presented a lecture to the Edinburgh Mathematics Society entitled "Has mathematics as it is or could be taught in schools, any cultural or educational value for the average pupil?"

== Memberships and awards ==
- Buchan was sent by the Scottish Education Department to represent Scotland in the Emergency Scheme for the Training of Teachers in India and for his service he was awarded the MBE.
- In 1927 he joined the Edinburgh Mathematical Society.
- In 1940, Buchan became a Fellow of the Royal Society of Edinburgh. His proposers were Edmund Whittaker, Alexander Aitken, David Gibb and Robert Schlapp.
- During World War II Buchan served in the Royal Air Force for three years, was Squadron Leader and Commandant in the Air Training Corps in Scotland. His contributions to the war effort were recognised on 13 June 1946 as part of the King's Birthday Honours.
- Buchan was part of the Scottish Freemasons. He was appointed grand secretary of the Grand Lodge of Scotland from 1948 to 1971.

== See also ==
- 1946 Birthday Honours

== Source ==
- "Alexander Fairley Buchan B.Sc., Ph.D. (Edin.)". Royal Society of Edinburgh Year Book. RSE Obituary: 27–28. 10 January 1976.
