= Hinke Osinga =

Dutch mathematician

- Born: 25 December 1969 (age 56); Dokkum, Netherlands
- Known for: Mathematical art
- Spouse: Bernd Krauskopf

Academic background
- Education: University of Groningen
- Thesis: Computing Invariant Manifolds: Variations on the Graph Transform (1996)
- Doctoral advisor: Henk Broer; Gert Vegter
- Other advisors: Ruth F. Curtain; Floris Takens

Academic work
- Discipline: Mathematics
- Institutions: University of Exeter; University of Bristol; University of Auckland

Hinke Maria Osinga (born 25 December 1969) is a Dutch mathematician and an expert in dynamical systems. She works as a professor of applied mathematics at the University of Auckland in New Zealand. As well as for her research, she is known as a creator of mathematical art.

== Education and career ==
Osinga earned a master's degree in 1991 and a Ph.D. in 1996 from the University of Groningen. Her doctoral dissertation, jointly supervised by dynamical systems theorist Henk Broer and computational geometer Gert Vegter, was on the computation of invariant manifolds.

After postdoctoral studies at The Geometry Center and the California Institute of Technology, and a short-term lecturership at the University of Exeter, she became a lecturer at the University of Bristol in 2001, and was promoted to reader and professor there in 2005 and 2011, respectively. She moved to Auckland in 2011, becoming the first female mathematics professor at Auckland and the second in New Zealand.

== Mathematical art ==
In 2004 Osinga created a crocheted visualization of the Lorenz manifold, an invariant manifold for the Lorenz system, and published the crochet pattern for her work with her husband Bernd Krauskopf; the resulting mathematical textile artwork involved over 25,000 crochet stitches, and measured nearly a meter across. Osinga and Krauskopf later collaborated with artist Benjamin Storch on a stainless steel sculpture that provides another interpretation of the same mathematical system.

== Awards and honours ==
Osinga was an invited speaker at the International Congress of Mathematicians in 2014, speaking on "Mathematics in Science and Technology". In 2015 she was elected as a fellow of the Society for Industrial and Applied Mathematics "for contributions to theory and computational methods for dynamical systems." In October 2016 she became the first female mathematician elected to the Royal Society of New Zealand. She was awarded the Aitken Lectureship in 2017.

In 2017 Osinga was selected as one of the Royal Society Te Apārangi's "150 women in 150 words", celebrating the contributions of women to knowledge in New Zealand. The same year she received the Moyal Medal from Macquarie University.

== Selected publications ==
- Krauskopf, Bernd; Osinga, Hinke (1999). "Two-dimensional global manifolds of vector fields". Chaos. 9 (3): 768–774. doi:10.1063/1.166450. PMID 12779872. Zbl 0983.37110. Wikidata Q52015379.
- Osinga, Hinke; JAN WIERSIG; PAUL GLENDINNING; ULRIKE FEUDEL (2001). "MULTISTABILITY AND NONSMOOTH BIFURCATIONS IN THE QUASIPERIODICALLY FORCED CIRCLE MAP". International Journal of Bifurcation and Chaos in Applied Sciences and Engineering. 11 (12): 3085–3105. arXiv:nlin/0005032. doi:10.1142/s0218127401004029. Zbl 1091.37507. Wikidata Q62266582.
- Osinga, Hinke; Krauskopf, Bernd (2004). "Crocheting the Lorenz Manifold". The Mathematical Intelligencer. 26 (4): 25–37. doi:10.1007/bf02985416. Zbl 1073.37036. Wikidata Q59699175.
- James Rankin; Osinga, Hinke (2017). "Parameter-dependent behaviour of periodic channels in a locus of boundary crisis". European Physical Journal. Special Topics. 226 (9): 1739–1750. doi:10.1140/epjst/e2017-70048-x. Wikidata Q59614300.
- Osinga, Hinke (2018). "Understanding the geometry of dynamics: the stable manifold of the Lorenz system". Journal of the Royal Society of New Zealand. 48 (2–3): 203–214. doi:10.1080/03036758.2018.1434802. Wikidata Q114465068.
- Andy Hammerlindl; Krauskopf, Bernd; Gemma Mason; Osinga, Hinke (2022). "Determining the global manifold structure of a continuous-time heterodimensional cycle". Journal of Computational Dynamics. 9 (3): 393. doi:10.3934/jcd.2022008. Zbl 1503.34079. Wikidata Q114464698.
