= Mazurov =

Mazurov (Russian: Мазуров) is a Slavic masculine surname whose feminine counterpart is Mazurova. Notable people with the surname include:

- Kirill Mazurov (1914–1989), Belarusian politician
- Victor Mazurov (born 1943), Russian mathematician
