= Peter Cameron (mathematician) =

Australian mathematician

Peter J. Cameron
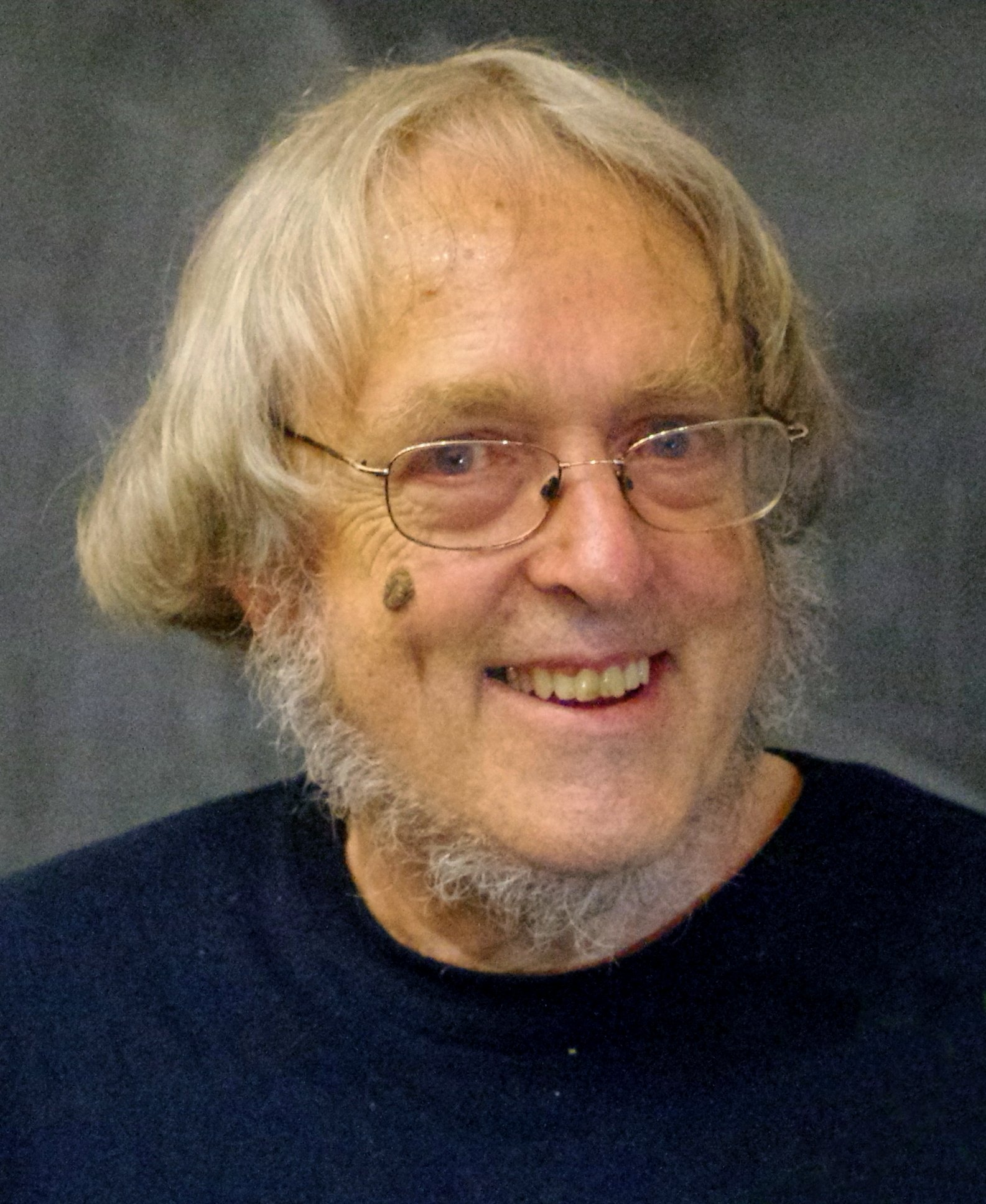
- Born: 23 January 1947 (age 79); Toowoomba, Queensland, Australia
- Education: University of Queensland (BSc); University of Oxford (DPhil)
- Awards: Whitehead Prize (1979); Euler Medal (2003); Forder Lecturer (2008)
- Scientific career
- Fields: algebra, group theory, combinatorics, coding theory, model theory
- Institutions: University of St Andrews; Queen Mary, University of London; University of Oxford; Bedford College, London
- Doctoral advisor: Peter M. Neumann
- Doctoral students: Eric Lander; Dugald Macpherson; Sarah Rees
- Other notable students: Benedict Gross

Peter Jephson Cameron FRSE (born 23 January 1947) is an Australian mathematician who works in group theory, combinatorics, coding theory, and model theory. He is currently Emeritus Professor at the University of St Andrews and Queen Mary University of London.

== Education ==
Cameron received a B.Sc. from the University of Queensland and a D.Phil. in 1971 from the University of Oxford as a Rhodes Scholar, with Peter M. Neumann as his supervisor. Subsequently, he was a Junior Research Fellow and later a Tutorial Fellow at Merton College, Oxford, and also lecturer at Bedford College, London.

== Work ==
Cameron specialises in algebra and combinatorics; he has written books about combinatorics, algebra, permutation groups, and logic, and has produced over 350 academic papers. In 1988, he posed the Cameron–Erdős conjecture with Paul Erdős.

== Honours and awards ==
He was awarded the London Mathematical Society's Whitehead Prize in 1979 and Senior Whitehead Prize in 2017, and is joint winner of the 2003 Euler Medal. In 2008, he was selected as the Forder Lecturer of the LMS and New Zealand Mathematical Society. In 2018 he was elected a Fellow of the Royal Society of Edinburgh.

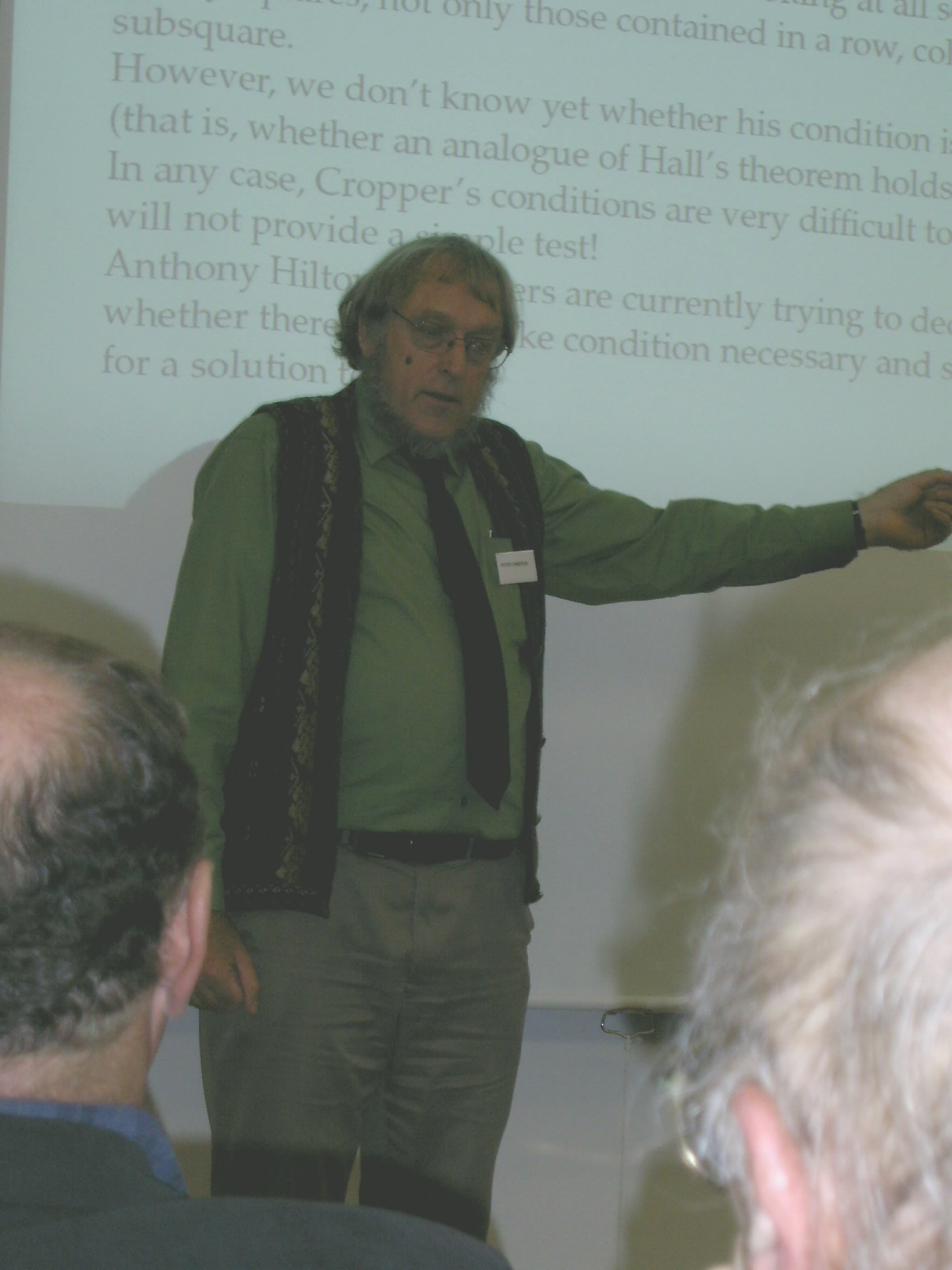
Peter Cameron giving the 2007 Dame Kathleen Ollerenshaw lecture at the School of Mathematics, University of Manchester

== Books ==
- Cameron, Peter J.; Lint, Jacobus Hendricus van (1975). Graph theory, coding theory, and block designs. Cambridge, Eng.: Cambridge University Press. ISBN 978-1-107-08708-8. OCLC 846492893.
- Cameron, Peter J. (10 June 1976). Parallelisms of Complete Designs. Cambridge University Press. doi:10.1017/cbo9780511662102. ISBN 978-0-521-21160-4.
- Cameron, Peter J. (29 June 1990). Oligomorphic Permutation Groups. Cambridge University Press. doi:10.1017/cbo9780511549809. ISBN 978-0-521-38836-8.
- Cameron, P. J.; Lint, J. H. van (19 September 1991). Designs, Graphs, Codes and their Links. Cambridge University Press. doi:10.1017/cbo9780511623714. ISBN 978-0-521-41325-1.
- Cameron, Peter J. (1994). Combinatorics : topics, techniques, algorithms. Cambridge: Cambridge University Press. ISBN 0-521-45133-7. OCLC 29910262.
- Cameron, Peter J. (1998). Sets, Logic and Categories. London: Springer London. ISBN 978-1-4471-0589-3. OCLC 958523400.
- Cameron, Peter J. (4 February 1999). Permutation Groups. Cambridge University Press. doi:10.1017/cbo9780511623677. ISBN 978-0-521-65302-2.
- Cameron, Peter J. (2008). Introduction to algebra. Oxford: Oxford University Press. ISBN 978-0-19-156622-6. OCLC 213466141.

== See also ==
- Cameron–Fon-Der-Flaass IBIS theorem
