= Donald Livingstone =

Donald Livingstone may refer to:

- Donald Livingstone (mathematician)
- Don Livingstone, politician
- Donald Livingston, philosopher
