= Proizvolov's identity =

Identity in number theory

In mathematics, Proizvolov's identity is an identity concerning sums of differences of positive integers. The identity was posed by Vyacheslav Proizvolov as a problem in the 1985 All-Union Soviet Student Olympiads.

To state the identity, take the first 2N positive integers,

1, 2, 3, ..., 2N − 1, 2N,

and partition them into two subsets of N numbers each. Arrange one subset in increasing order:

$$A_1 < A_2 < \cdots < A_N.$$

Arrange the other subset in decreasing order:

$$B_1 > B_2 > \cdots > B_N.$$

Then the sum

$$|A_1-B_1| + |A_2-B_2| + \cdots + |A_N-B_N|$$

is always equal to N^{2}.

== Example ==
Take for example N = 3. The set of numbers is then {1, 2, 3, 4, 5, 6}. Select three numbers of this set, say 2, 3 and 5. Then the sequences A and B are:

A_{1} = 2, A_{2} = 3, and A_{3} = 5;
B_{1} = 6, B_{2} = 4, and B_{3} = 1.

The sum is

$$|A_1-B_1| + |A_2-B_2| + |A_3-B_3| = |2-6| + |3-4| + |5-1| = 4+1+4 = 9,$$

which indeed equals 3^{2}.

== Proof ==
For any $a,b$, we have: $|a-b|=\max\{a,b\}-\min\{a,b\}$. For this reason, it suffices to establish that the sets $\{\max\{a_i,b_i\}:1\le i\le n\}$ and :$\{n+1,n+2,\dots,2n\}$ coincide. Since the numbers $a_i,b_i$ are all distinct, it suffices to show that for any $1\le k\le n$, $\max\{a_k,b_k\}>n$. Assume the contrary that this is false for some $k$, and consider $n+1$ positive integers $a_1,a_2,\dots,a_k,b_k,b_{k+1},\dots,b_n$. Clearly, these numbers are all distinct (due to the construction), but there are at most $n$ of them, which is a contradiction.
