= Endre Süli =

Mathematician and professor

Endre Süli FRS
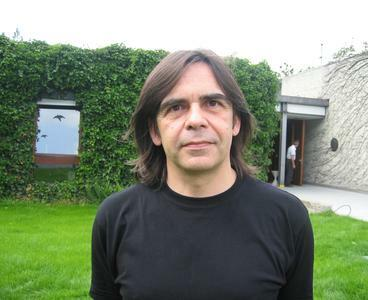
- Süli at Oberwolfach, 2007
- Born: 21 June 1956 (age 70); Yugoslavia
- Citizenship: British and Serbian
- Education: University of Belgrade; BSc 1978, MSc 1980, PhD 1985; University of Oxford; MA 1985
- Awards: Foreign Member of the Serbian Academy of Sciences and Arts (2009); Member of the European Academy of Sciences (2010); LMS/NZMS Forder Lectureship (2015); SIAM Fellow (2016); Member of the Academia Europaea (2020); Naylor Prize and Lectureship (2021); Pro Urbe Prize of the City of Subotica (2021); Fellow of the Royal Society (2021)
- Scientific career
- Fields: Numerical analysis of partial differential equations
- Workplaces: University of Belgrade 1978-1985; University of Oxford 1985-
- Website: people.maths.ox.ac.uk/suli

Endre Süli FRS (also, Endre Suli or Endre Šili) is a mathematician. He is Emeritus Professor at the University of Oxford (since 1 October 2025) and Emeritus Fellow of Worcester College, Oxford (since 1 October 2025), formerly Professor of Numerical Analysis in the Mathematical Institute, University of Oxford (between 1 October 1985 and 30 September 2025), Fellow and Tutor in Mathematics at Worcester College, Oxford (between 1 October 2005 and 30 September 2025) and Fellow of Linacre College, Oxford (between 1 October 1985 and 30 September 2005). He was educated at the University of Belgrade and, as a British Council Visiting Student, at the University of Reading and St Catherine's College, Oxford. His research is concerned with the mathematical analysis of numerical algorithms for nonlinear partial differential equations.

== Biography ==
Süli was elected a Foreign Member of the Serbian Academy of Sciences and Arts (2009), Fellow of the European Academy of Sciences (FEurASc, 2010), Fellow of the Society for Industrial and Applied Mathematics (FSIAM, 2016), member of the Academia Europaea (MAE, 2020), and a Fellow of the Royal Society (FRS, 2021).

He was an invited speaker at the International Congress of Mathematicians in Madrid in 2006 and was Chair of the Society for the Foundations of Computational Mathematics (2002–2005). Other honours include: Fellow of the Institute of Mathematics and its Applications (FIMA, 2007), Charlemagne Distinguished Lecture (2011), IMA Service Award (2011), Professor Hospitus Universitatis Carolinae Pragensis, Charles University in Prague (2012–), Distinguished Visiting Chair Professor Shanghai Jiao Tong University (2013), President, SIAM United Kingdom and Republic of Ireland Section (2013–2015), London Mathematical Society/New Zealand Mathematical Society Forder Lectureship (2015), Aziz Lecture (2015), BIMOS Distinguished Lecture (2016), John von Neumann Lecture (2016), Sibe Mardešić Lecture (2018), London Mathematical Society Naylor Prize and Lectureship (2021).

Since 2005 Süli has been co-Editor-in-Chief of the IMA Journal of Numerical Analysis published by Oxford University Press. He is a member of the Board of the Doctoral School for Mathematical and Physical Sciences for Advanced Materials and Technologies of the Scuola Superiore Meridionale at the University of Naples, and was a member of the Scientific Steering Committee of the Isaac Newton Institute for Mathematical Sciences at the University of Cambridge (2011–2014), the Scientific Advisory Board of the Berlin Mathematical School (2016–2018), the Scientific Council of Société de Mathématiques Appliquées et Industrielles (SMAI) (2014–2020), the Scientific Committee of the Mathematisches Forschungsinstitut Oberwolfach (Mathematical Research Institute of Oberwolfach) (2013–2021), the Scientific Advisory Board of the Berlin Mathematics Research Center MATH+ (2019–2025) and the Scientific Advisory Board of the Archimedes Center for Modeling, Analysis and Computation at the University of Crete (2010–2014). Between 2014 and 2022 he served as Delegate for Mathematics to the Board of Delegates of Oxford University Press.

He grew up in Subotica and is a recipient of the Pro Urbe Prize of the City of Subotica (2021). He is the father of Sterija Award-winning Serbian playwright and dramatist Fedor Süli (also, Fedor Šili) and social scientist Timea Süli.
