= Ian C. Percival =

British theoretical physicist

Ian Colin Percival
- Born: Ian Colin Percival; July 27, 1931 (age 95)
- Scientific career
- Fields: Mathematics and Physics (theoretical)
- Workplaces: University of London

Ian Colin Percival (born 27 July 1931) is a British theoretical physicist. He is the Emeritus Professor of the School of Physics and Astronomy at Queen Mary University, University of London.

== Education ==
Percival was educated at Ealing County Grammar School and University College London, where he took his BSc and PhD.

== Career ==
He is one among the pioneers of quantum chaos and he is well known for his suggestion in the 1970s about the existence of a different type of spectra of quantum-mechanical systems due to classical chaos. Numerical explorations performed by other researchers clearly confirmed this idea later. In 1987, with Franco Vivaldi, he used the algebraic number theory of quadratic number fields to count the periodic orbits in generalized Arnold-Sinai cat maps. Later on, he worked on the basics of quantum mechanics and the measurement process. Together with Walter Strunz, he suggested the properties of the quantum foam at the Planck scale (similar to the movement of particles due to Brownian motion) in the wave function of an atom-beam interference.

== Awards ==
In 1985 he was awarded the Naylor Prize. In 1999 he was awarded the Paul Dirac Medal and Prize by the Institute of Physics. He is a Fellow of the Royal Society.

== Books and articles ==
- Together with Derek Richards: Introduction to Dynamics, Cambridge University Press 1982
- "Chaos: A Science for the Real World", in Nina Hall (editor), The New Scientist Guide to Chaos, Penguin 1992 (also New Scientist, 21 October 1989)
- Quantum State Diffusion, Cambridge University Press 1998
- Together with Nicolas Gisin, "The Quantum-State Diffusion Model applied to Open Systems", Journal of Physics A, volume 25, 1992, pp. 5677–91
- Published with P. Cvitanović, A. Wirzba: Quantum Chaos–Quantum Measurement, Kluwer 1992 (in which by Percival: "Quantum Records")
- Published with Michael Berry, Nigel Oscar Weiss: Dynamical Chaos, Royal Society London 1987, Princeton University Press 1989 (Royal Society Discussion Meeting 4–5 February 1987)
- "Chaos in Hamiltonian Systems", Proc. Roy. Soc., A, volume 413, 1987, pp. 131–143
- "Integrable and nonintegrable Hamiltonian systems'" in'Non-linear dynamics aspects of particle accelerators, Lecture Notes in Physics, volume 247, 1986, pp. 12–36
