= Winifred Betts =

New Zealand botanist and university lecturer (1894–1971)

Winifred Aitken
- Born: Mary Winifred Betts; 11 May 1894; Nelson, New Zealand
- Died: 29 April 1971 (aged 76); Edinburgh, Midlothian, Scotland
- Occupations: Botanist and university lecturer
- Known for: First female lecturer at the University of Otago
- Spouse: Alexander Aitken (m. 1920; died 1967)

Mary Winifred Aitken (née Betts; 11 May 1894 – 29 April 1971) was a New Zealand botanist. She was the first female lecturer at the University of Otago.

== Biography ==
Born in Nelson on 11 May 1894, Betts was the daughter of printer and stationer Alfred George Betts and Ada Betts (née Grindley). Known to friends as Winnie, she was educated at Nelson College for Girls and received her Bachelor of Science (1916) and Master of Science (1917) degrees from the University of Otago. On her graduation, she received the National Research Scholarship that was awarded at the university each year, which offered her an income of £100 a year, plus lab expenses, so she could conduct independent research.

Betts was appointed university lecturer in botany in 1920 at age 25, the first woman to earn that designation. She was described by the pre-eminent botanist Leonard Cockayne as “the most brilliant woman scientist in New Zealand".

Also in 1920, she married another Otago graduate, the mathematician Alexander Aitken, and the couple remained in New Zealand as Winnie Aitken continued her botany lectures until 1923. In December 1923, the couple moved to Scotland so her husband could pursue his academic career; subsequently, he was named professor of mathematics at the University of Edinburgh.

Winifred Aitken died in Edinburgh on 29 April 1971.

== Recognition ==
In 2017, Betts was selected as one of the Royal Society of New Zealand's "150 women in 150 words".
