= Naylor Prize and Lectureship =

Naylor Prize and Lectureship in Applied Mathematics
- Country: United Kingdom
- Presented by: London Mathematical Society (LMS)
- Eligibility: Mathematician normally resident in the United Kingdom
- Established: 1976
- Website: www.lms.ac.uk/prizes/naylor-prize-and-lectureship-applied-mathematics

The Naylor Prize and lectureship in Applied Mathematics is a prize of the London Mathematical Society awarded every two years in memory of Dr V.D. Naylor. The award is restricted to a mathematician who reside in the United Kingdom. The "grounds for award can include work in, and influence on, and contributions to applied mathematics and/or the applications of mathematics, and lecturing gifts." The honor consists of a prize (a sum of money and a diploma) and the invitation to deliver the Naylor Lecture at a meeting of the Society, usually in the year following the award.

== Prize winners ==
- 1977 James Lighthill
- 1979 Basil John Mason
- 1981 H. Christopher Longuet-Higgins
- 1983 Michael J. D. Powell
- 1985 I C Percival
- 1987 Douglas Samuel Jones
- 1989 J D Murray
- 1991 Roger Penrose
- 1993 Michael Berry
- 1995 John Ball
- 1997 Frank Kelly
- 1999 Stephen Hawking
- 2000 Athanassios S. Fokas
- 2002 Mark H. A. Davis
- 2004 Richard Jozsa
- 2007 Michael Green
- 2009 Philip Maini
- 2011 John Bryce McLeod
- 2013 Nick Trefethen
- 2015 S. Jonathan Chapman
- 2017 John King
- 2019 Nicholas Higham
- 2021 Endre Süli
- 2023 Jens G. Eggers
- 2025 Helen Byrne

== See also ==
- Forder Lectureship
- Whitehead Prize
- Senior Whitehead Prize
- Shephard Prize
- Fröhlich Prize
- Berwick Prize
- Pólya Prize (LMS)
- De Morgan Medal
- List of mathematics awards
