= Robert Schlapp =

British physicist

Robert Schlapp FRSE (18 July 1899 – 31 May 1991) was a 20th-century British physicist and mathematician of German descent. He was affectionately known as Robin Schlapp.

== Life ==
He was born in Edinburgh on 18 July 1899, the youngest of three children of Anna Lotze and Otto Schlapp. His father only appears in Post Office Directories around 1910, at which point he is listed as a university lecturer living at 54a George Square. His father lectured in German at the University of Edinburgh and later (1926) became the University's first Professor of German.

He was educated at George Watson's College, where his father had taught from 1887 to 1894. He was school dux for 1916/17.

In the First World War, obviously a potential problem due to his German background, he enlisted under the Derby Scheme and joined the 31st battalion of the Middlesex Regiment in 1917 at the age of 18. This was a labouring unit rather than a fighting battalion, involved in tasks such as trench construction. After the war, Schlapp studied mathematics and physics at the University of Edinburgh graduating MA around 1923 then doing postgraduate studies at the University of Cambridge gaining a doctorate (PhD) in 1925.

Returning to the University of Edinburgh he began lecturing in Natural Philosophy (Physics) and Applied Mathematics in autumn 1925. He became Senior Lecturer in Mathematical Physics in 1927. In this role he was assistant to Charles Galton Darwin (who had recently replaced Cargill Gilston Knott).

In 1927, he was elected a Fellow of the Royal Society of Edinburgh. His proposers were Sir Edmund Taylor Whittaker, Sir Charles Galton Darwin, David Gibb, and Edward Thomas Copson. He served as Curator of the Society's artefacts from 1959 to 1969 and as their Vice President from 1969 to 1972.

In 1983, he won the Society's bicentenary medal (presented to him by Queen Elizabeth II). He was President of the Edinburgh Mathematical Society.

In 1936 Professor Darwin retired and was replaced by Max Born whom Schlapp then assisted in turn. Schlapp retired in 1969, and died in Ashford in Kent on 31 May 1991.

== Family ==
Whilst playing cello in his brother, Walter Schlapp's, string quartet, he met Mary Fleure (who played second violin). He married her in 1940. They had two daughters. Mary died in 1975.

== Publications ==
- Colin Maclaurin, a Biographical Note (1949)
- The Contribution of the Scots to Mathematics (1973)
