= Niall Livingstone =

British-South African classical scholar (1966–2019)

Niall Livingston
- Education: University of Oxford (PhD)
- Partner: Elizabeth Clements
- Parents: Donald Livingstone (father); Trudy Livingstone (mother)
- Scientific career
- Institutions: University of Birmingham
- Thesis: Isocrates' Busiris : a commentary; with special reference to rhetorical purpose and technique. (1995)
- Doctoral advisor: Doreen Innes

Niall Livingston (1966-2019) was a British-South African classical scholar and Senior Lecturer in Classics at the University of Birmingham. He won the Gaisford Prize for Greek prose in 1987.
