= Harold Silverstone =

New Zealand mathematician & communist

- Born: Harold Silverstone; 20 January 1915; Dunedin, Otago, New Zealand
- Died: 1974; Dunedin, Otago, New Zealand
- Education: University of Otago
- Scientific career
- Fields: Mathematics
- Doctoral advisor: Alexander Aitken

Harold Silverstone (1915–1974) was a New Zealand mathematician and statistician.

== Early life and education ==
He was born on 20 January 1915 in Dunedin, Otago, New Zealand. His father Mark Woolf Silverstone was a Jewish immigrant from Poland. Harold Silverstone was educated at Otago Boys High School. He later attended the University of Otago where he attained a B.A. in 1934 and an M.A. in 1935. He completed his PhD at the University of Edinburgh in 1939.

== Academic career ==
He was appointed a lecturer at the Department of Mathematics at the Otago University in 1946. He was appointed as the Statistician to the New Zealand National Service Department in 1940.

== Contributions to mathematics ==
He has made numerous contributions to mathematics, such as independently deriving the Cramér–Rao bound.

== Personal life ==
He was married twice, once to Madge Silverstone and another time to Eleanor Matilda Silverstone.

He was a lifelong member of the New Zealand Communist Party.
