= Sarah Rees (professor) =

British mathematician and academic

Sarah Elizabeth Rees (born 1957) is Professor of Pure Mathematics at Newcastle University. Her focus of research is on geometrical, combinatorial and computational aspects of group theory.

Rees obtained her Ph.D. in 1983 from the University of Oxford. Her dissertation, supervised by Peter Cameron, was On Diagram Geometry.

In 2003, Rees was a member of the expert panel for BBC Radio 4's In Our Time on infinity.

Rees is the daughter of mathematician David Rees.

== Selected publications ==
- Holt, Derek F; Rees, Sarah; Röver, Claas E (2017), Groups, languages, and automata, London Mathematical Society student texts, 88., ISBN 978-1-316-60652-0
- Ciobanu, Laura; Derek F. Holt; Rees, Sarah (2016), "Rapid decay and Baum-Connes for large type Artin groups", Transactions of the American Mathematical Society, 368 (9): 6103–6129, arXiv:1203.1198, doi:10.1090/tran/6532, S2CID 54007941
- Rees, Sarah (August 2017), "Antony G. O'Farrell and Ian Short, Reversibility in Dynamics and Group Theory, London Mathematical Society Lecture Notes Series, Volume 416", Book Reviews, Proceedings of the Edinburgh Mathematical Society, 60 (3): 811–812, doi:10.1017/S0013091517000013, S2CID 164277147
- Holt, Derek F; Rees, Sarah (2012), "Artin groups of large type are shortlex automatic with regular geodesics", Proceedings of the London Mathematical Society, 104 (3): 486–512, arXiv:1003.6007, doi:10.1112/plms/pdr035, S2CID 17061541
- Holt, Derek F; Rees, Sarah (1994), "Testing modules for irreducibility", Journal of the Australian Mathematical Society, 57: 1, doi:10.1017/S1446788700036016
