= Quantum carpet =

Quantum Carpet for the particle in the infinite potential well. The horizontal axis is the particle position. The running animation time is the change of the initial wave function.

In quantum mechanics, a quantum carpet is a regular art-like pattern drawn by the wave function evolution or the probability density in the space of the Cartesian product of the quantum particle position coordinate and time or in spacetime resembling carpet art. It is the result of self-interference of the wave function during its interaction with reflecting boundaries. For example, in the infinite potential well, after the spread of the initially localized Gaussian wave packet in the center of the well, various pieces of the wave function start to overlap and interfere with each other after reflection from the boundaries. The geometry of a quantum carpet is mainly determined by the quantum fractional revivals.

Quantum carpets demonstrate many principles of quantum mechanics, including wave-particle duality, quantum revivals, and decoherence. Thus, they illustrate certain aspects of theoretical physics.

In 1995, physicist Michael Berry created the first quantum carpet, which described the momentum of an excited atom. Today, physicists use quantum carpets to demonstrate complex theoretical principles.

== As demonstrations of theoretical principles ==
=== Wave-particle duality ===
Quantum carpets demonstrate wave-particle duality by showing interference within wave packets.

Wave particle duality is difficult to comprehend. However, quantum carpets provide an opportunity to visualize this property. Consider the graph of the probability distribution of an excited electron in a confined space (particle in a box), where brightness of color corresponds to momentum. Lines of dull color (ghost terms or canals) appear across the quantum carpet. In these canals, the momentum of the electron is very small. Destructive interference, when the trough of a wave overlaps with the crest of another wave, causes these ghost terms. In contrast, some areas of the graph display bright color. Constructive interference, when the crests of two waves overlap to form a larger wave, causes these bright colors. Thus, quantum carpets provide visual evidence of interference within electrons and other wave packets. Interference is a property of waves, not particles, so interference within these wave packets prove that they have properties of waves in addition to properties of particles. Therefore, quantum carpets display wave particle duality.

=== Quantum revivals ===
Quantum carpets demonstrate quantum revivals by showing the periodic expansions and contractions of wave packets.

When the momentum of a wave packet is graphed on a quantum carpet, it displays an intricate pattern. When the temporal evolution of this wave packet is graphed on quantum carpets, the wave packet expands, and the initial pattern is lost. However, after a certain period of time, the waveform contracts and returns to its original state, and the initial pattern is restored. This continues to occur with periodic regularity. Quantum revivals, the periodic expansion and contraction of wave packets, are responsible for the restoration of the pattern. Although quantum revivals are mathematically complex, they are simple and easy to visualize on quantum carpets, as patterns expanding and reforming. Thus, quantum carpets provide clear visual evidence of quantum revivals.

=== Decoherence ===
Quantum carpets demonstrate decoherence by showing a loss of coherence over time.

When the temporal evolution of an electron, photon, or atom is graphed on a quantum carpet, there is initially a distinct pattern. This distinct pattern shows coherence. That is to say, the wave can be split in two pieces and recombined to form a new wave. However, this pattern fades with time, and eventually, devolves into nothing. When the pattern fades, coherence is lost, and it is impossible to split the wave in two and recombine it. This loss of coherence is called decoherence. A set of complex mathematical equations model decoherence. However, a simple loss of pattern shows decoherence in quantum carpets. Thus, quantum carpets are a tool to visualize and simplify decoherence.

== History ==
While performing an experiment on optics, English physicist Henry Fox Talbot inadvertently discovered the key to quantum carpets. In this experiment, a wave struck a diffraction grating, and Talbot noticed that the patterns of grating repeated themselves with periodic regularity. This phenomenon became known as the Talbot effect. The bands of light that Talbot discovered were never graphed on an axis, and thus, he never created a true quantum carpet. However, the bands of light were similar to the images on a quantum carpet. Centuries later, physicists graphed the Talbot effect, creating the first quantum carpet. Since then, scientists have turned to quantum carpets as visual evidence for quantum theory.

== See also ==
- Talbot effect
