= Cameron–Fon-Der-Flaass IBIS theorem =

Mathematical theory

In mathematics, the Cameron–Fon-Der-Flaass IBIS theorem bridges algebraic combinatorics and group theory. The theorem was discovered in 1995 by two mathematicians Peter Cameron and Dima Von-Der-Flaass.

== Statement ==
Consider the group action of a permutation group $G$ acting on a set $\Omega$. A base is a sequence of elements of $\Omega$ which, when fixed, destroys all symmetry, i.e. its pointwise stabilizer is trivial. A base is irredundant if each element further reduces symmetry, i.e. no element in the sequence is fixed by the pointwise stabiliser of its predecessors. Now the following are equivalent:

- All irredundant bases of $G$ have the same size;
- The irredundant bases of $G$ are preserved by re-ordering;
- The irredundant bases of $G$ form the bases of a matroid.
