= Astrid an Huef =

German-born New Zealand mathematician

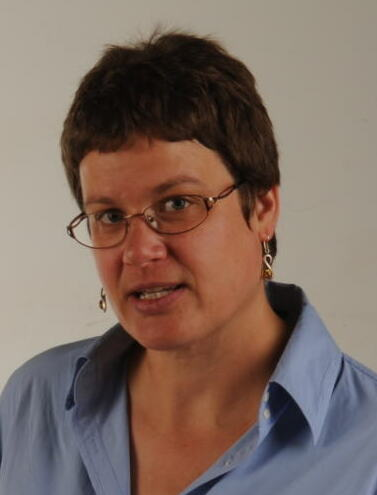
- an Huef in 2010
- Born: 20. century Karlsruhe
- Awards: Fellow of the Royal Society Te Apārangi, Fellow of the New Zealand Mathematical Society

Academic background
- Education: Dartmouth College, University of Newcastle
- Doctoral advisor: Dana Peter Williams

Astrid an Huef is a German-born New Zealand mathematician who holds a professorship at Victoria University of Wellington. Until 2017, she held the Chair of Pure Mathematics at the University of Otago. Her research interests include functional analysis, operator algebras, and dynamical systems, particularly operator algebras associated with dynamical systems. She was the president of the New Zealand Mathematical Society for the 2016–2017 term.

== Education and career ==
An Huef was born in Karlsruhe and lived in New Zealand for two years as a teenager before moving to Australia in 1985. Because of the disruption to her education caused by these international moves, she was advised not to take higher mathematics in high school, but did so anyway. She began her undergraduate studies in computer science at the University of Newcastle, but ended up doing a double degree, with honours in mathematics. While there, she met Dartmouth College professor Dana Williams, who became her doctoral advisor at Dartmouth beginning in 1994. She completed her doctorate in 1999. She has collaborated with mathematicians internationally on research related to C algebras and mathematical structures connected to dynamical systems.

She took a tenure track position at the University of Denver, and then worked at the University of New South Wales for eight years, before being given the chair at Otago in 2008. She currently coordinates the Women in Mathematics community of the New Zealand Mathematical Society.

In 2019, An Huef was elected a Fellow of the Royal Society of New Zealand. Te Apārangi in recognition of her contributions to mathematical research.
