= All-Russian Olympiad of schoolchildren =

Student competitions

All-Russian Olympiad of schoolchildren Всероссийская олимпиада школьников
- Status: Active
- Genre: Academic competition
- Begins: September
- Ends: May/June
- Frequency: Annual
- Location: Various
- Country: Russia
- Inaugurated: 1989
- Most recent: 2026
- Next event: 2027
- Attendance: about 7,000,000
- Organiser: Ministry of Education and Science
- Website: https://vos.olimpiada.ru/?ysclid=ljemb1g5op155425775

The All-Russian Olympiad of schoolchildren (Russian: Всероссийская Олимпиада Школьников (ВСОШ)) is the Russian national system of annual academic subject competitions for schoolchildren in federal, municipal and private schools, organised by the Ministry of Education.

== History ==
Although the first All-Russian Olympiad was organized in 1989, the roots of the olympiad date back to academic competitions of Soviet Union olympiads, which had been organized since the 1930s. Winners and awardees of the final stage of the Olympiad are granted entry into any Russian university, without requisite tests or exams. Winners and awardees of other stages also receive benefits when applying to Russian universities. Some of the competitions originate from the Soviet All-Union olympiads: mathematics (1960s), chemistry (1967), physics (1967), biology (1979).

== Structure ==
The olympiad consists of 24 subjects, and five stages for each subject: preliminary, school, municipal, regional, and federal (final) stage.

The preliminary stage usually takes place in summer. It is done online via the Unified system of registration. This stage is not obligatory, and it is usually used for testing the system.

The school stage is the first obligatory, and second overall phase. Since 2020, in some regions it has been organised online or with the help of school computers. It is overseen by regional departments of the Ministry of Education and Science, and is regionally variable.

Winners and awardees of the school stage are allowed to participate in the third, municipal phase. It is usually done in school, but in some regions, an online form is available.

Following the municipal stage, the fourth regional stage is always held in one location of the respective region. It is organised by the education ministry of this region.

The fifth and final stage is the federal stage, organised by the Ministry of Education, to which only a handful of students progress.

== Statistics ==
According to a Ministry of Education and Science, 20.3 million tests were completed in the school stage (a student can participate in multiple subjects).

All - Russian olympiad 2023 statistics
	Participated in school stage	Participated in municipal stage	Participated in regional stage	Number of winners / awardees of the Regional stage	Participated in final stage	Number of winners / awardees of the Final stage
English	1 415 365	202 020	10 572	731 / 3 380	286	23 / 108
Astronomy	390 153	67 925	3 636	210 / 665	245	20 / 87
Biology	1 361 619	223 399	10 583	595 / 2 863	298	24 / 113
Geography	1 184 814	164 246	7 760	273 / 1 591	251	24 / 105
IT	639 489	66 167	6 884	369 / 1 630	349	27 / 132
Art	356 161	67 055	6 863	443 / 1 869	246	20 / 97
History	1 221 409	178 350	10 607	398 / 2 413	314	26 / 127
Spanish	110 556	12 620	796	81 / 257	107	8 / 41
Italian	8 856	3 590	484	54 / 134	61	5 / 23
Chinese	15 638	6 271	1 006	106 / 268	103	7 / 41
Literature	1 374 242	208 696	15 494	825 / 4 171	317	26 / 121
Mathematics	2 481 991	250 769	9 723	420 / 2 200	480	34 / 182
German	124 853	25 808	3 168	222 / 948	223	18 / 86
Social studies	1 291 734	236 982	13 726	676 / 3 485	290	37 / 116
Basics of life safety	872 069	147 734	8 870	600 / 2 599	228	19 / 89
Law	417 501	105 543	9 713	470 / 2 470	266	22 / 107
Russian	2 480 760	264 188	14 685	423 / 2 657	311	27 / 125
Technology	884 627	101 164	6 473	704 / 1 817	341	30 / 141
Physics	858 732	152 672	7 266	299 / 1 515	372	30 / 141
Physical education	1 207 645	173 658	9 114	572 / 2 942	256	21 / 99
French	49 261	16 272	2 340	166 / 722	216	16 / 87
Chemistry	597 340	124 091	5 973	316 / 1 429	298	25 / 115
Ecology	543 568	116 811	6 216	512 / 1 864	290	23 / 117
Economics	373 278	74 977	7 144	304 / 1 454	364	30 / 137
