= Middlesex Regiment alien labour units =

Works Battalions and Alien Companies of the Middlesex Regiment
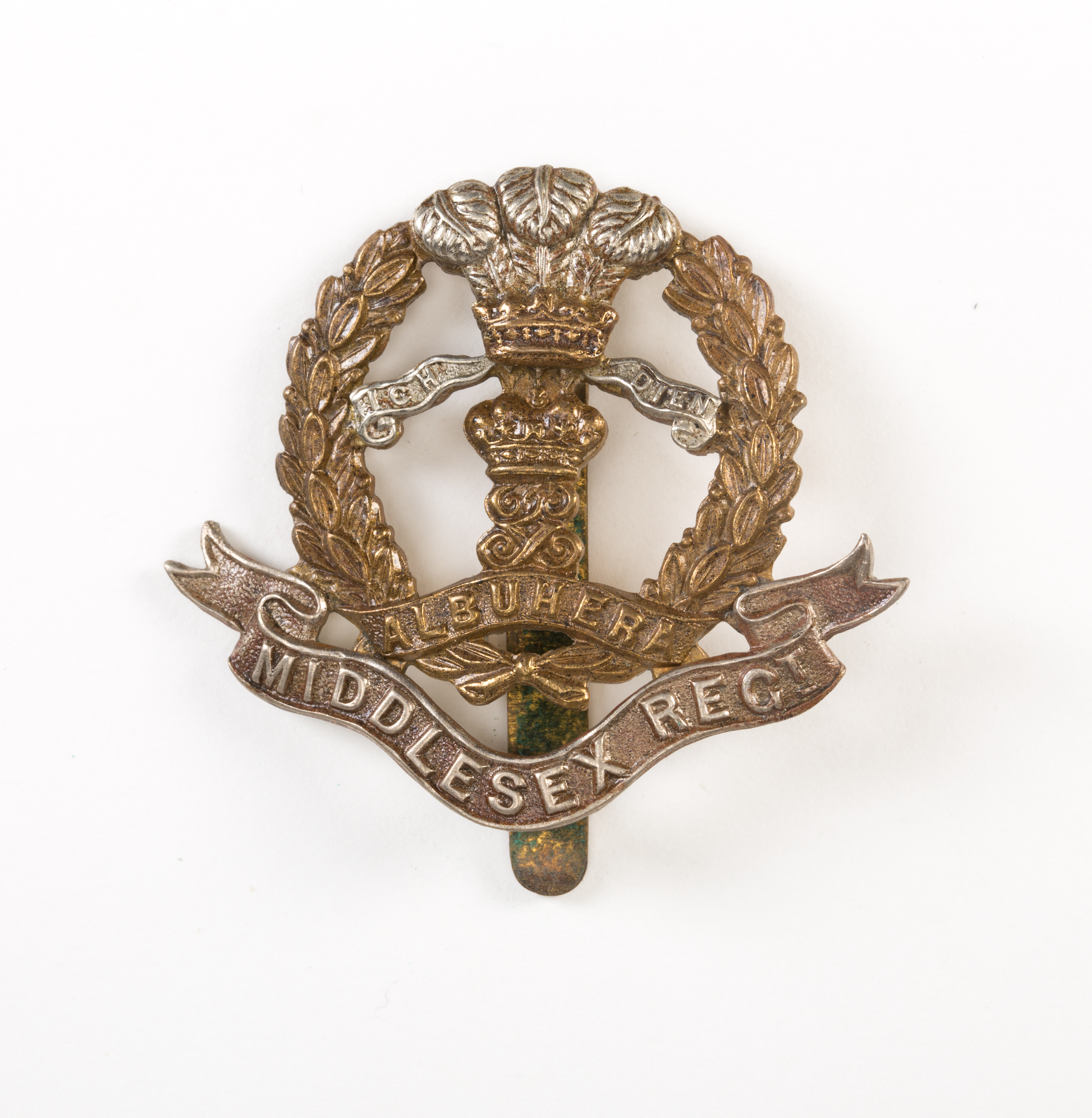
- Cap Badge of the Middlesex Regiment as issued during the First World War
- Active: 1916–1920
- Country: United Kingdom
- Branch: British Army
- Type: Non-combatant
- Role: Labour
- Size: 2 battalions 8 independent companies

A number of alien labour units were established in the British Army's Middlesex Regiment during the First World War. The introduction of conscription of British citizens in 1916 led to a dilemma about what to do with the naturalised sons of enemy citizens. An instruction from the Army Council established the 30th and 31st (Works) Battalions of the Middlesex Regiment to take these men. These units would provide labour only and not serve in combat; in this way the units were similar to those of the Labour Corps but were distinct from it.

The two battalions served only in Britain until 1917 when a shortage of labour led to independent companies being formed to serve in France on the lines of communication. Following the Russian withdrawal from the war, additional foreign-born men serving in the British Army were also sent to the units. In total eight companies were formed. There was some criticism in the House of Commons over the decision to deploy the men abroad and the length of time it took to demobilise them after the war.

== Background ==
During the early part of the First World War aliens (i.e. foreign nationals) of hostile states, such as the Central Powers, were relatively unaffected. The naturalised sons of some of these aliens volunteered, and were accepted, to serve in the British Army. The rise of anti-German sentiment after the 7 May 1915 sinking of the RMS Lusitania saw the implementation of a general internment programme for aliens from hostile states.

The introduction of conscription from March 1916 provided a dilemma to the British government. The War Office was reluctant to take conscripted British citizens of enemy parentage into combat units but to exempt them from conscription was likely to lead to anger among other British citizens. Army Council Instruction 1209 of June 1916 attempted to provide a solution; a non-combatant labour unit was to be established to accept such citizens.

== Establishment ==
The 30th (Works) Battalion of the Middlesex Regiment was the first to be established in August 1916. It was soon filled and a second unit, the 31st (Works) Battalion, was also raised. Citizens liable to serve were only those who had been born in Britain or brought there before the age of 10 and who had remained resident since that point. Existing citizens of this type who were already serving in the army were also transferred to the unit, though a later Army Council Instruction allowed for an exemption to be made at the request of the combat unit's commanding officer. Those already serving as non-commissioned officers (NCOs) were permitted to keep their ranks when transferred. Additional personnel were drawn from Western, Southern and Northern Commands, who were each asked to supply enough officers and NCOs to command one company of each battalion.

Men serving in the battalions were largely of German, Austrian, Hungarian, Bulgarian and Turkish origin. The only exceptions made were for those of Czech origin whose parents had been exempted from internment. This was because Czechs were generally regarded as unwilling subjects of the Austro-Hungarian Empire and because a Czech Legion was already fighting for the Entente. The War Office declined a Home Office suggestion that interned Czechs should be posted to the units, proposing instead that the Home Office form its own civilian units.

The two battalions were administered by the Labour Directorate but did not form part of that organisation's Labour Corps, by request of the War Office. The men of the Labour Corps were generally those considered unfit for combat duty while the 30th and 31st Battalions were formed of fit men, indeed Brigadier-General Edward Gurth Wace of the Labour Directorate described them as "excellent workers". The battalions initially provided labour to the Eastern and Southern Commands. The 30th Battalion was based firstly at Crawley, West Sussex, before moving to Reading, Berkshire, in September 1916. The 31st Battalion was first based at Mill Hill, London, moving to Sevenoaks, Kent, in 1917 and Reigate, Surrey; Harpenden, Hertfordshire; and Croydon, London, in 1918.

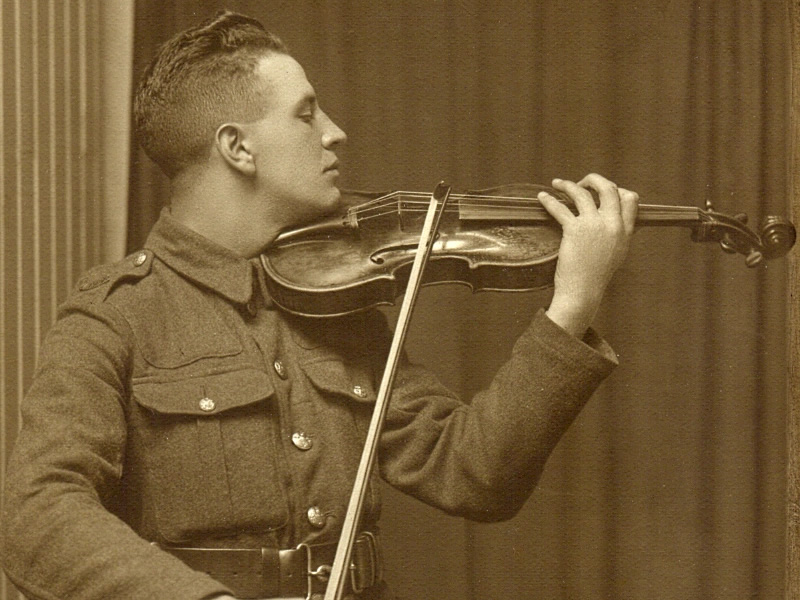
Samuel Kutcher, born in Whitechapel to Jewish immigrants from Poland, served in the 31st (Works) Battalion and later founded the Kutcher String Quartet.

The units were the subject of an article in the London Evening Standard in September 1916. A journalist had come across one of the battalions after covering the case of a deserting soldier who had absconded after being posted there. The journalist described it as the "queerest battalion in the British Army". He noted that many serving soldiers were unaware of it and that the parent regiment did not want to be associated with what had been described as a "foreign legion" and nicknamed the "Kaiser's Own". The latter was a play on the Middlesex Regiment's designation as "Duke of Cambridge's Own".

== Service in France ==
By early 1917 the British Army was beginning to be hampered by a shortage of labour on the lines of communication leading to the Western Front. The Middlesex works battalions were called upon to provide manpower. Independent labour companies were formed from the two battalions; the first of these was the 1st (Alien) Company of four officers and 493 other ranks, (Note: The size of the labour companies was similar to that of the Army Service Corps labour companies formed at the start of the war to unload supplies at French ports, these had a strength of 536 men of all ranks. The Middlesex Regiment labour companies were significantly larger in size than infantry companies (227 men) and companies of the Non-Combatant Corps (100 men). British Army labour battalions, formed from infantrymen unsuitable for combat deployment, had a strength of around 1,000 men. With the exception of the Middlesex units, foreign corps and the Non-Combatant Corps all British labour units were reorganised into British Labour Corps companies of around 500 men from May 1917.) which arrived in France on 6 March 1917. The 2nd, 3rd and 4th Companies, of similar size, were sent in the following weeks. The 30th and 31st Battalions remained as formed units in Britain to accommodate men who were unfit to serve abroad and to serve as collecting points for men prior to posting abroad.

The companies were organised and equipped on the same basis as the labour companies of the Non-Combatant Corps, but remained under the auspices of the Middlesex Regiment. Because of a perceived security risk the alien labour companies were not permitted to remain for more than a few days at base depots: drafts passing through and separated men were prioritised for transport to their units. The companies were not permitted to deploy to sensitive areas or to be split into small detachments. Men of the alien labour units could not transfer to other units without permission from the War Office. The men were issued steel helmets on arrival in France.

The decision to deploy the units in France was questioned in Parliament on 8 March by the Liberal Party MP Joseph King and Philip Snowden of the Labour Party. King thought that the men had been promised they would not be deployed abroad "to fight their own kith and kin". The Under-Secretary of State for War, the Liberal Party's Ian Macpherson, replied that no such promise had been made and that the unit was non-combatant in nature. King separately claimed that the promise had been made by the former Secretary of State for War Field Marshal Herbert Kitchener, 1st Earl Kitchener and, to the mother of at least one man, by the British Army's director of recruiting. King feared that the men in the labour companies would be shot as traitors if captured in the field. Macpherson replied to King that the order to form the 30th Battalion was made some days after Kitchener had drowned and that no record was found of any promise he made.

King raised the matter again on 15 March, stating that the men in the units "think in German more than in English ... their conversation is largely carried on in German. They all have German names, they sing together German songs, and though I believe they are loyal subjects of the King and of our cause, undoubtedly they have strong German associations". He noted that many of the men's fathers were interned as enemy aliens and some had brothers or other relatives serving in the armies of the Central Powers. He restated that he had been told the men had been promised they would serve only in Britain and that he had now heard that an NCO of the unit had lost his rank for protesting against their deployment. He asked if the companies then awaiting transport to France would be retained in Britain. Macpherson declined to comment further, referring King to his statements made on 8 March.

Following the Treaty of Brest-Litovsk of March 1918 which saw the Russian withdrawal from the war, Russians and other aliens whom "it was not desirable to retain with fighting units" were transferred from British combatant arms to labour units. The non-Russians of this category were assigned to the Middlesex Regiment, allowing additional labour companies to be formed. The 5th and 6th Companies were deployed to France in April 1918, the 7th Company in July and the 8th Company in December, after the Armistice of 11 November 1918 that ended the war.

== Post-war ==
In February 1919 the war veteran and MP Josiah Wedgwood stated, in the House of Commons, that the men in the Middlesex alien labour units had been told they would be the last to be demobilised as they were the sons of aliens. The Secretary of State for War, Winston Churchill, replied that they were being treated the same as other army personnel when it came to eligibility for demobilisation. The progress of demobilisation can be judged by the battalions' entries in the monthly Army Lists, which detail the assignments of British Army officers. Both battalions appeared on the May 1920 army list but by July 1920 the 31st Battalion is no longer listed and only one officer is shown as belonging to the 30th Battalion. The August 1920 Army List shows the 30th Battalion as still extant but with no officers assigned to it; it did not appear in the September 1920 Army List.

One former member of the Middlesex alien labour units, William Meller (born Wilhelm Moeller), of German and Swiss descent remained in France after the war as a gardener, tending war graves for the Imperial War Graves Commission. He was interned by the Germans after the 1940 Battle of France and died while imprisoned for his British nationality in Nazi Germany in 1942.

== See also ==
- Jewish Legion, combatant battalions of the Royal Fusiliers including Jewish alien volunteers
- Robert Schlapp, who served in the 31st Battalion
