= Forder Lectureship =

Award conferred by the London Mathematical Society

- The LMS-NZMS Forder Lectureship
- Named after: Henry George Forder
- Established: 1986
- Founders: London Mathematical Society (LMS); New Zealand Mathematical Society (NZMS)
- Type: Lecture Series
- Purpose: Recognizes an eminent UK mathematician through a New Zealand lecture tour to promote strong mathematical ties.
- Location: New Zealand (NZ universities)
- Website: www.lms.ac.uk/events/lectures/forder-and-aitken-lectureship

The Forder Lectureship is awarded by the London Mathematical Society to a research mathematician from the United Kingdom who has made an eminent contribution to the field of mathematics and who can also speak effectively at a more popular level. The lectureship is named for Professor H.G. Forder, formerly of the University of Auckland, and a benefactor of the London Mathematical Society. The lectureship was funded in 1986 by the London Mathematical Society and the New Zealand Mathematical Society, first began in 1987, and is normally awarded every two years. Recipients of the lectureship will give a four- to six-week lecturing tour of most New Zealand universities. In alternate years the Aitken Lectureship is awarded.

== Recipients ==
The recipients of the Forder Lectureship are:

- 1987: E.C. Zeeman
- 1989: Michael F. Atiyah
- 1991: Peter Whittle
- 1993: Roger Penrose
- 1995: E.G. Rees
- 1997: Ian Stewart
- 1999: Michael Berry
- 2001: Tom Körner
- 2003: Caroline Series
- 2005: Martin Bridson
- 2008: Peter Cameron
- 2010: Ben Green
- 2012: Geoffrey Grimmett
- 2015: Endre Süli
- 2016: Julia Gog
- 2020: Julia Wolf
- 2023: Imre Leader

== See also ==
- Naylor Prize and Lectureship
- List of mathematics awards
