= Takens's theorem =

Conditions under which a chaotic system can be reconstructed by observation

Rössler attractor reconstructed by Takens' theorem, using different delay lengths. Orbits around the attractor have a period between 5.2 and 6.2.

In the study of dynamical systems, a delay embedding theorem gives the conditions under which a chaotic dynamical system can be reconstructed from a sequence of observations of the state of that system. The reconstruction preserves the properties of the dynamical system that do not change under smooth coordinate changes (i.e., diffeomorphisms), but it does not preserve the geometric shape of structures in phase space.

Takens' theorem is the 1981 delay embedding theorem of Floris Takens. It provides the conditions under which a smooth attractor can be reconstructed from the observations made with a generic function. Later results replaced the smooth attractor with a set of arbitrary box counting dimension and the class of generic functions with other classes of functions.

It is the most commonly used method for attractor reconstruction.

Delay embedding theorems are simpler to state for discrete-time dynamical systems. The state space of the dynamical system is a ν-dimensional manifold M. The dynamics is given by a smooth map

$$f: M \to M.$$

Assume that the dynamics f has a strange attractor $A\sub M$ with box counting dimension d_{A}. Using ideas from Whitney's embedding theorem, A can be embedded in k-dimensional Euclidean space with

$$k > 2 d_A.$$

That is, there is a diffeomorphism φ that maps A into $\R^k$ such that the derivative of φ has full rank.

A delay embedding theorem uses an observation function to construct the embedding function. An observation function $\alpha : M \to \R$ must be twice-differentiable and associate a real number to any point of the attractor A. It must also be typical, so its derivative is of full rank and has no special symmetries in its components. The delay embedding theorem states that the function

$$\varphi_T(x) = \bigl(\alpha(x), \, \alpha(f(x)), \, \dots, \, \alpha(f^{k-1}(x)) \, \bigr)$$

is an embedding of the strange attractor A in $\R^k.$

== Simplified version ==
Suppose the $d$-dimensional state vector $x_t$ evolves according to an unknown but continuous and (crucially) deterministic dynamic. Suppose, too, that the one-dimensional observable $y$ is a smooth function of $x$, and “coupled” to all the components of $x$. Now at any time we can look not just at the present measurement $y(t)$, but also at observations made at times removed from us by multiples of some lag $\tau: y_{t+\tau}, y_{t+2\tau}$, etc. If we use $k$ lags, we have a $k$-dimensional vector. One might expect that, as the number of lags is increased, the motion in the lagged space will become more and more predictable, and perhaps in the limit $k \to \infty$ would become deterministic. In fact, a valid embedding of the dynamics is achieved at a finite dimension; not only that, but the deterministic dynamics are completely equivalent to those of the original state space (precisely, they are related by a smooth, invertible change of coordinates, or diffeomorphism). In fact, the theorem says that reconstruction is possible once you reach dimension $2d+1$, and the minimal embedding dimension is often less.

== Choice of delay ==
Takens' theorem is usually used to reconstruct strange attractors out of experimental data, for which there is contamination by noise. As such, the choice of delay time becomes important. Whereas for data without noise, any choice of delay is valid, for noisy data, the attractor would be destroyed by noise for delays chosen badly.

The optimal delay is typically around one-tenth to one-half the mean orbital period around the attractor.

== See also ==
- Whitney embedding theorem
- Nonlinear dimensionality reduction
