= Henry Forder =

New Zealand mathematician (1889–1981)

Henry George Forder
- Born: 27 September 1889; Shotesham All Saints, near Norwich, England
- Died: 21 September 1981 (aged 91); Point Chevalier, Auckland, New Zealand

Henry George Forder (27 September 1889 – 21 September 1981) was a New Zealand mathematician.

== Academic career ==
Born in Shotesham All Saints, near Norwich, he won a scholarships first to a Grammar school and then to University of Cambridge. After teaching mathematics at a number of schools, he was appointed to the chair of mathematics at Auckland University College in New Zealand in 1933. He was very critical of the state of the New Zealand curriculum and set about writing a series of well received textbooks.

His Foundations of Euclidean Geometry (1927) was reviewed by F.W. Owens, who noted that 40 pages are devoted to "concepts of classes, relations, linear order, non archimedean systems, ..." and that order axioms together with a continuity axiom and a Euclidean parallel axiom are the required foundation. The object achieved is a "continuous and rigorous development of the [Euclidean] doctrine in the light of modern investigations."

In 1929 Forder obtained drawings and notes of Robert William Genese on the exterior algebra of Grassmann. He relied on methods of H. F. Baker in Principles of Geometry to extend Genese's beginning into a complete development with applications throughout geometry. When The Calculus of Extension appeared in 1941 it was reviewed by Homer V. Craig: "The theorem density is exceptionally high and consequently despite the superior exposition it is not an easy book to work straight through – perhaps the key chapters suffer from a lack of recapitulation... [It] provides the best exposition of the fundamental processes of the Ausdehnungslehre and the most inclusive treatment of the geometrical applications available at present."

Henry Forder was elected Fellow of the Royal Society of New Zealand in 1947 and received an honorary DSc from the University of Auckland in 1959.

== Forder lectureship ==
The Forder Lectureship was established jointly by the London Mathematical Society and the New Zealand Mathematical Society in his honour in 1986.

== Selected works ==
- 1927: The Foundations of Euclidean Geometry via Internet Archive
- 1930: A School Geometry
- 1931: Higher Course Geometry
- 1941: The Calculus of Extension via Internet Archive
- 1950: Geometry via Internet Archive
- 1953: Coordinates in Geometry
