= Jens G. Eggers =

British physicist

Jens G. Eggers from the University of Bristol, was awarded the status of Fellow in the American Physical Society, after they were nominated by their Division of Fluid Dynamics in 2009, for applications of the ideas of singularities to free-boundary problems such as jet breakup, drop formation, air entrainment, thin-film dynamics including wetting, dewetting and contact line motions, and with further applications to polymeric flows and models for granular dynamics.

Eggers was awarded the Naylor Prize and Lectureship in 2023 for his contributions to the theoretical understanding of singularities of nonlinear partial differential equations.

== See also ==
- List of fellows of the American Physical Society (1998–2010)
