= Dugald Macpherson =

British mathematician

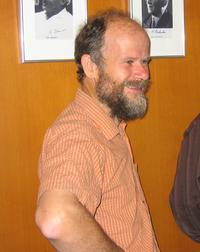
Dugald Macpherson

H. Dugald Macpherson is a mathematician and logician. He is a professor of pure mathematics at the University of Leeds.

He obtained his DPhil from the University of Oxford in 1983 for his thesis Enumeration of Orbits of Infinite Permutation Groups under the supervision of Peter Cameron. In 1997, he was awarded the Junior Berwick Prize by the London Mathematical Society. He continues to research into permutation groups and model theory. He is scientist in charge of the MODNET team at the University of Leeds. He co-authored the book Notes on Infinite Permutation Groups.
