= Aitken interpolation =

Algorithm used for polynomial interpolation

Aitken interpolation is an algorithm used for polynomial interpolation that was derived by the mathematician Alexander Aitken. It is similar to Neville's algorithm.

See also Aitken's delta-squared process or Aitken extrapolation.
