= Nora Calderwood =

Scottish mathematician and professor

- Born: Nora Isobel Calderwood; 14 March 1896; Blairgowrie and Rattray
- Died: April 1985 (aged 89); Selly Oak
- Education: University of Edinburgh (PhD)
- Scientific career
- Fields: Mathematics
- Thesis: Researches in the Theory of Matrices
- Doctoral advisor: Alexander Aitken

Nora Isobel Calderwood (14 March 1896 – April 1985) was a Scottish professor and mathematician.

== Early life and education ==
Calderwood was born in 1896 in Blairgowrie, Perthshire, in Scotland. Her father Daniel Scott Calderwood was the headmaster of the Blairgowrie Public School. Her family then moved to Edinburgh when she was still young, after her father was appointed as the headmaster of the Church of Scotland Normal School.

Calderwood started at James Gillespie's School in 1901, at the age of five, staying for six years. On receiving a bursary from the Edinburgh Burgh Committee on Secondary Education, she studied at Edinburgh Ladies' College from 1907 to 1914. In 1910, at the age of 14, she passed Higher Piano, and in 1913 was named the dux of the music classes at Edinburgh Ladies' College. She was also awarded the prize to the best Science scholar and best Arithmetician, both of which she resigned, and the Costorphine Prize for the best mathematician.

Calderwood studied at the University of Edinburgh from 1914 to 1920, earning a Bachelor of Science (Pure) in 1919 and a Master of Arts in Political Economy in 1920. Courses taken include mathematics, Latin, natural philosophy and chemistry. She joined the faculty of the University of Birmingham the following year, lecturing in mathematics. Soon, however, she returned to Edinburgh to continue her studies under mathematician Alexander Aitken, earning a PhD in mathematics from the university in 1931 with a thesis on Researches in the Theory of Matrices.

== Career and research ==
Calderwood was a member of Edinburgh Mathematical Society joined in 1919 as an undergraduate, and the London Mathematical Society, joined in 1922.

She is fondly listed by a student, Margaret Lee née Ireland (1962 BSc Mathematics) as one of her favourite memories: "Dr Nora Calderwood - what a woman who loved us so much, she could barely keep exam questions secret".

=== Awards and honours ===
Hers is the namesake for the Calderwood Prize, an academic award at the University of Birmingham.

== Personal life ==
Calderwood never married. She was an accomplished piano player, and gave recitals at Birmingham.
