= Aitken Lectureship =

Award conferred by the New Zealand Mathematical Society

- Aitken Lectureship
- Named after: Alexander Aitken
- Founded: 2009
- Founders: London Mathematical Society (LMS); New Zealand Mathematical Society (NZMS)
- Type: Lecture Series
- Location: United Kingdom (UK universities)
- Website: www.lms.ac.uk/events/lectures/forder-and-aitken-lectureship

The Aitken Lectureship is awarded by the New Zealand Mathematical Society to a research mathematician from New Zealand. The lectureship is named for New Zealand professor Alexander Aitken, who was a highly distinguished mathematician who spent most of his career at the University of Edinburgh. The lectureship was funded in 2009 by the London Mathematical Society and the New Zealand Mathematical Society, and is normally awarded every two years, alternating with the Forder Lectureship. Recipients of the lectureship will give a several-week lecturing tour of UK universities and a lecture at the annual meeting of the London society.

== Recipients ==
The recipients of the Aitken Lectureship are:

- 2011: Geoff Whittle
- 2013: Robert Mclachlan
- 2015: Steven Galbraith
- 2017: Hinke Osinga
- 2019: Bakh Khoussainov
- 2022: Lisa Orloff Clark

== See also ==
- List of mathematics awards
