= Floris Takens =

Dutch mathematician (1940–2010)

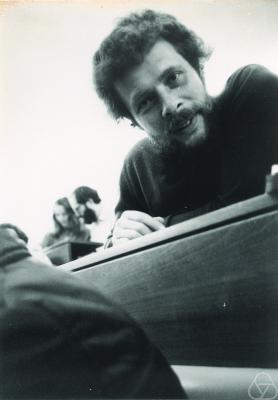
- Floris Takens at the University of Warwick in 1980 (photo from Mathematical Research Institute of Oberwolfach)
- Born: 12 November 1940; Zaandam, Netherlands
- Died: 20 June 2010 (aged 69)
- Education: University of Amsterdam
- Known for: Takens's theorem
- Scientific career
- Fields: Mathematics
- Doctoral advisor: Nicolaas Kuiper

Floris Takens (12 November 1940 – 20 June 2010) was a Dutch mathematician known for contributions to the theory of chaotic dynamical systems.

Together with David Ruelle, he predicted that fluid turbulence could develop through a strange attractor, a term they coined, as opposed to the then-prevailing theory of accretion of modes. The prediction was later confirmed by experiment. Takens also established the result now known as the Takens's theorem, which shows how to reconstruct a dynamical system from an observed time-series. He was the first to show how chaotic attractors could be learned by neural networks.

Takens was born in Zaandam in the Netherlands. He attended schools in The Hague and in Zaandam before serving in the Dutch army for one year (1960–1961). At the University of Amsterdam, he concluded his undergraduate and graduate studies. He was granted a doctorate in mathematics in 1969 under the supervision of Nicolaas Kuiper for his thesis The minimal number of critical points of a function on a compact manifold and the Lusternik–Schnirelmann category.

After his graduate work, Takens spent a year at the Institut des Hautes Études Scientifiques, in Bures-sur-Yvette, near Paris, where he worked with David Ruelle, René Thom, and Jacob Palis. His friendship with Palis took him many times to the Instituto de Matemática Pura e Aplicada (IMPA) in Rio de Janeiro, Brazil. Their collaboration produced several joint publications.

Takens was a professor at the University of Groningen, in Groningen, the Netherlands, from 1972 until he retired from teaching in 1999.

Takens was a member of:

- The Royal Netherlands Academy of Arts and Sciences (since 1991)
- The Brazilian Academy of Sciences (since 1981), and
- The editorial board for the Springer-Verlag's Lecture Notes in Mathematics.

== Selected publications ==
- Ruelle, David; Takens, Floris (1971). "On the nature of turbulence". Communications in Mathematical Physics. 20 (3): 167–192. Bibcode:1971CMaPh..20..167R. doi:10.1007/BF01646553.
- Takens, Floris (1981). "Detecting strange attractors in turbulence". Lecture Notes in Mathematics. pp. 366–381.
- Newhouse, Sheldon E.; Palis, Jacob Jr.; Takens, Floris (1983). "Bifurcations and stability of families of diffeomorphisms". Publications Mathématiques de l'IHÉS. 57: 1–71. doi:10.1007/BF02698773. S2CID 102339975.
- Bakker, Rembrandt; Schouten, Jaap C.; Giles, C. Lee; Takens, Floris; Van den Bleek, Cor M. (2000). "Learning chaotic attractors by neural networks". Neural Computation. 12 (10): 2355–2383. doi:10.1162/089976600300014971. PMID 11032038. S2CID 16416364.

== See also ==
- Bogdanov–Takens bifurcation

== Sources ==
- Broer, Henk W.; Krauskopf, Bernd; Vegter, Gert, eds. (2001). Global Analysis of Dynamical Systems festschrift dedicated to Floris Takens for his 60th birthday. IOP Publishing. ISBN 0-7503-0803-6.
- Floris Takens - Academia Brasileira de Ciências. Accessed on 26 January 2010.
