= Henk Broer =

Dutch mathematician

Hendrik Wolter Broer
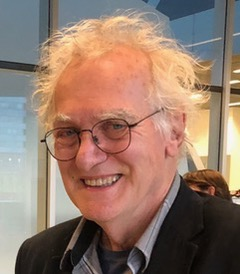
- Broer photographed in 2021
- Born: 18 February 1950; Diever, Netherlands
- Education: University of Groningen
- Known for: Nonlinear dynamical systems
- Scientific career
- Fields: Mathematics
- Workplaces: University of Groningen, Boston University, Universitat de Barcelona, Universite de Bourgogne
- Doctoral advisor: Floris Takens
- Notable students: George B. Huitema; Hinke M. Osinga; Bernd Krauskopf; Gerton A. Lunter; Evgeny A. Verbitskiy

Hendrik Wolter Broer (18 February 1950) is a Dutch mathematician working in the field of nonlinear dynamical systems. Most of his work concerns fundamental aspects of the theory. He is most noted for his research regarding bifurcation theory (or phase transitions) involving multi- or quasi-periodicity, order amidst chaos, as this occurs abundantly mechanics, astronomy and physics and other dynamical settings.

== Biography ==
Henk Broer was born in Diever in 1950. From 1967 on he studied mathematics and physics at the University of Groningen, where he got his MSc in 1974 and his PhD degree in 1979. In 1980 he was appointed assistant professor at the mathematics department of the University of Groningen. In 1991 he became professor of dynamical systems. He was managing director of the Dutch Research Council (NOW) based research cluster Nonlinear Dynamics of Natural Systems (NDNS), that united all dynamical systems research in the Netherlands.

The first semester of 1985 he was visiting professor at Boston University. He held short term positions at the Universitat de Barcelona (Spain), at the Université de Bourgogne (Dijon, France), at the Georgia Institute of Technology (Atlanta, USA) and the Universidade Federal do Rio de Janeiro (IFRJ) / Instituto Matemática Pura e Aplicada (IMPA) in Rio de Janeiro (Brazil). He served a term as chairperson of the mathematics chamber of the Association of Universities in the Netherlands (VSNU) and of the Royal Dutch Mathematical Society (Koninklijk Wiskundig Genootschap). In these two administrative duties he contributed to the unification of the Dutch mathematicians in their contacts with the Dutch government. He also was one of the founders of the Dutch inter-university masterprogramme Mastermath.

In 2008 he became a member of the Royal Netherlands Academy of Arts and Sciences (Koninklijke Nederlandse Akademie voor Kunsten en Wetenschappen - KNAW), where he served a term as chairperson of the section Mathematics. He was a long term managing editor of the Dutch journal Indagationes Mathematicæ. In 2015 he became emeritus professor. During the first decade of the 21st century Broer was a member of two government-installed committees reviewing the secondary school curriculum: the "Commissie Toekomst Wiskundeonderwijs" (cTWO) and the steering committee "Natuur, Leven en Technologie" (NLT).

== Research contributions ==
In his PhD thesis, Broer worked on bifurcations of singularities in volume preserving vector fields, where he discovered quasi-periodic invariant tori for the first time. This was the starting point of a large scale inventory of occurrences: together with his school he set up a supporting theory of bifurcating tori, thereby combining singularity theory with the Kolmogorov-Arnold-Moser (KAM) theory 1 (Moser 1967) (Zehnder 1975-6), as reported in 2, 3, and 4. (Numbers refer to works under Selected publications.) Broer also worked on geometrically inspired or computationally assisted results 5, 6, 7, 8, 9, 10, 11, some including applications to modeling. (ibid.)

== Awards and honors ==
Broer became a member of the Royal Netherlands Academy of Arts and Sciences (KNAW) in 2008. At the international conference Mathematical Analysis and Applications of 2024 in Porto he obtained a career award for applications of analysis in the theory of dynamical systems. At his retirement in 2015 he was appointed knight of the order of the Netherlands lion.

== Selected publications ==
1. H.W. Broer, KAM theory: the legacy of Kolmogorov’s 1954 paper. Bulletin of the American Mathematical Society 41(4) (2004) 507-521. doi:10.1090/S0273-0979-04-01009-2
2. H.W. Broer, G.B. Huitema and M.B. Sevryuk, Quasi-periodic tori in families of dynamical systems: order amidst chaos. Lecture Notes in Mathematics 1645 Springer Verlag 1996. doi:10.1007/978-3-540-49613-7
3. H.W. Broer and F. Takens, Dynamical Systems and Chaos. Applied Mathematical Sciences 172 Springer Verlag 2011. doi:10.1007/978-1-4419-6870-8; Hardcover ISBN 978-1-4419-6869-2; Softcover ISBN 978-1-4614-2712-4
4. H.W. Broer, G.B. Huitema, F. Takens and B.L.J. Braaksma, Unfoldings and bifurcations of quasi-periodic tori. Mem AMS 83(421) American Mathematical Society 1990. eBook ISBN 978-1-4704-0844-2
5. H.W. Broer, H. Hanßmann, On Jupiter and his Galilean satellites: librations of De Sitter’s periodic motions. Indag Math NS 27(5) 1305-1337 (2016). doi:10.1016/j.indag.2016.09.002
6. K. Efstathiou and H.W. Broer, Uncovering fractional monodromy. Commun. Math. Phys. 324 (549-588) (2013). doi:10.1007/s00220-013-1816-9
7. H.W. Broer, C. Simó, R. Vitolo, Bifurcations and strange attractors in the Lorenz-84 climate model with seasonal forcing. Nonlinearity 15(4) (2002) 1205-1267. doi:10.1088/0951-7715/15/4/312
8. H.W. Broer and C. Simó, Resonance tongues in Hill’s equations: a geometric approach. Journ. Diff. Eqns. 166 290-327 (2000). doi:10.1006/jdeq.2000.3804
9. H.W. Broer, C. Simó and J.C. Tatjer, Towards global models near homoclinic tangencies of dissipative diffeomorphisms. Nonlinearity 11(3) (1998) 667-770. doi:10.1088/0951-7715/11/3/015
10. H.W. Broer and F.M. Tangerman, From a differentiable to a real analytic perturbation theory, applications to the Kupka Smale theorems Ergod. Th. & Dynam. Sys. 6 345-362 (1986). doi:10.1017/S0143385700003540
11. H.W. Broer and G. Vegter, Subordinate Sil’nikov bifurcations near some singularities of vector fields having low codimension. Ergod. Th. & Dynam. Sys. 4 509-525 (1984). doi:10.1017/S0143385700002613
