= Michael Berry (physicist) =

British theoretical physicist (born 1941)

Sir Michael Berry FRS FRSE FRSA HonFInstP
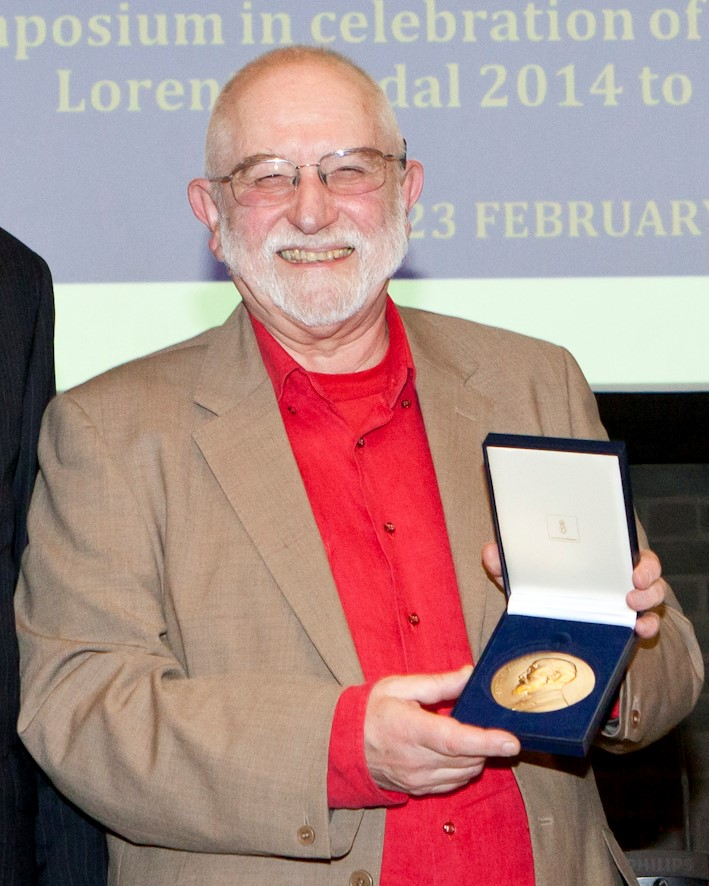
- Berry in 2015
- Born: Michael Victor Berry; 14 March 1941 (age 85); Frimley, Surrey, England
- Education: University of Exeter (BSc); University of St. Andrews (PhD)
- Known for: Berry phase; Berry connection and curvature; Berry–Robbins problem; Berry–Tabor conjecture; Weyl–Berry conjecture; Quantum carpet; Quantum chaos
- Awards: Maxwell Medal and Prize (1978); Fellow of the Royal Society (1982); Lilienfeld Prize (1990); Royal Medal (1990); IOP Dirac Medal (1990); Naylor Prize and Lectureship (1992); ICTP Dirac Medal (1996); Knight Bachelor (1996); Wolf Prize (1998); Ig Nobel prize (2000); Onsager Medal (2001); Pólya Prize (2005); Lorentz Medal (2014); Isaac Newton Medal (2025)
- Scientific career
- Workplaces: University of Bristol
- Thesis: The diffraction of light by ultrasound (1965)
- Doctoral advisor: Robert Balson Dingle
- Doctoral students: Jenny Nelson; Jonathan Keating
- Website: michaelberryphysics.wordpress.com

Sir Michael Victor Berry (born 14 March 1941) is a British theoretical physicist. He is the Melville Wills Professor of Physics (Emeritus) at the University of Bristol.

Berry is known for the Berry phase, a phenomenon observed in both quantum mechanics and classical optics, as well as Berry connection and curvature. He specializes in semiclassical physics (asymptotic physics, quantum chaos), applied to wave phenomena in quantum mechanics and other areas such as optics.

== Early life and education ==
Berry was brought up in a Jewish family and was the son of a London taxi driver and a dressmaker. Berry earned a BSc in physics from the University of Exeter in 1962 where he met his first wife (a sociology student with whom he had his first child) and a PhD from the University of St. Andrews in 1965. His thesis is titled The diffraction of light by ultrasound.

== Career and research ==
He has spent his whole career at the University of Bristol. He was a research fellow, 1965–67; lecturer, 1967–74; reader, 1974–78; Professor of Physics, 1978–88; and Royal Society Research Professor 1988–2006. Since 2006, he has been Melville Wills Professor of Physics (Emeritus) at Bristol University.

== Awards and honours ==
He was elected a Fellow of the Royal Society (FRS) in 1982 and knighted in 1996. From 2006 to 2012 he was editor of Proceedings of the Royal Society A.

Berry has been given the following prizes and awards:

- Maxwell Medal and Prize, Institute of Physics, 1978
- Elected Fellow of the Royal Society of London, 1982
- Elected Fellow of the Royal Society of Arts, 1983
- Elected Fellow of the Royal Institution, 1983
- Elected Member of the Royal Society of Sciences in Uppsala, Sweden, 1986
- Bakerian Lecturer, Royal Society, 1987
- Elected member of the European Academy of Sciences and Arts, 1989
- Dirac Medal, Institute of Physics, 1990
- Lilienfeld Prize, American Physical Society, 1990
- Royal Medal, Royal Society, 1990
- Naylor Prize and Lectureship in Applied Mathematics, London Mathematical Society, 1992
- Foreign Member: US National Academy of Sciences, 1995
- Dirac Medal, International Centre for Theoretical Physics, 1996
- Awarded honorary Doctor of Science degree in Trinity College Dublin, 1996
- Kapitsa Medal, Russian Academy of Sciences, 1997
- Wolf Prize for Physics, Wolf Foundation, Israel, 1998, jointly with Yakir Aharonov
- Honorary Fellow of the Institute of Physics, 1999
- Forder Lectureship, London Mathematical Society, 1999
- Foreign Member: Royal Netherlands Academy of Arts and Sciences, 2000
- Ig Nobel Prize for Physics, 2000 (shared with Andre Geim for "The Physics of Flying Frogs"). By 2022 his and Geim's Ig Nobel for the magnetic levitation of a frog was reportedly part of the inspiration for China's lunar gravity research facility.
- Onsager Medal, Norwegian University of Science and Technology, 2001
- Gibbs Lecturer, American Mathematical Society, 2002
- 1st and 3rd prizes, Visions of Science, Novartis/Daily Telegraph, 2002
- Elected to Royal Society of Edinburgh, 2005
- Pólya Prize, London Mathematical Society, 2005
- Doctor of Science, honoris causa, University of Glasgow, 2007
- Selected Clarivate Citation laureate in Physics in 2009, jointly with Aharonov.
- Doctor of Science, honoris causa, Russian-Armenian (Slavonic) University in Yerevan, 2012
- Lorentz Medal, 2014
- Lise Meitner Distinguished Lecture, 2019
- Institute of Physics Newton Medal and Lecture, 2025

== See also ==
- S. Pancharatnam
- Gordon decomposition
- Hilbert–Pólya conjecture
- List of Ig Nobel Prize winners
- Riemann hypothesis
- Spin-stabilized magnetic levitation
- Superoscillation
- Weierstrass–Mandelbrot function
