= Donald Livingstone (mathematician) =

South African mathematician

- Born: 1924
- Died: 15 October 2001 (aged 77)
- Education: University of Edinburgh (PhD)
- Spouse: Trudy Livingstone
- Children: Niall Livingstone
- Scientific career
- Institutions: University of Birmingham, University of Michigan
- Thesis: On the Theory of Matrices with Elements in the Clebsoh-Aronhold Symbolic Calculus (1949)
- Doctoral advisor: Alexander Craig Aitken

Donald Livingstone (1924 – 15 October 2001) was a South African mathematician and former Chair of Pure Mathematics at the University of Birmingham. Previously he was a professor at the University of Michigan. He was a member of the London Mathematical Society.
