= Victor Mazurov =

Russian mathematician (born 1943)

Victor Danilovich Mazurov (Russian: Виктор Данилович Мазуров; born January 31, 1943) is a Russian mathematician. He is well known for his works in group theory and is the founder of the Novosibirsk school of finite groups. Mazurov is a Corresponding Member of the Russian Academy of Sciences.

Mazurov's parents Daniil Petrovich and Evstolia Ivanovna were teachers. Victor went to elementary school in a village of Kuvashi and finished high school with highest honors in Zlatoust. He then moved to Sverdlovsk (now Yekaterinburg) to study mathematics in Ural State University. His advisers in Sverdlovsk were Victor Busarkin and Albert Starostin. In 1963 Mazurov married his university classmate Nadezhda Khomenko. After graduating in 1965, they moved to Novosibirsk where Mazurov joined the research staff of the Sobolev Institute of Mathematics (Russian: Институт математики СО РАН).

Mazurov is an editor (with Evgenyj Khukhro) of the "Kourovka Notebook", a periodically updated collection of over 1,000 open problems in Group Theory.

Mazurov obtained several results that contributed to the proof of the classification of finite simple groups, also known as the Enormous Theorem and considered one of the greatest achievements in mathematics of the 20th century.

He is one of the initial group of fellows of the American Mathematical Society.
