= David Gibb (mathematician) =

Scottish mathematician and astronomer

David Gibb FRSE (31 October 1883 – 28 March 1946) was a Scottish mathematician and astronomer. He was the first person to use the term numerical integration.

== Life ==
Gibb, eldest son of Robert Gibb, a salt manufacturer, and his wife Joanna, was born in Methil near Leven, Fife on 31 October 1883. He attended Leven Public School and then George Watsons College in Edinburgh (1896–99). He studied mathematics and sciences at the University of Edinburgh, graduating with a MA/BSc in 1906 . While being a student, he lodged with Mr Flockhart at 3 West Preston Street, Edinburgh. In 1909 he began lecturing in mathematics at the university.

In 1910 he was elected a Fellow of the Royal Society of Edinburgh for his contributions to mathematics and astronomy. His proposers were George Chrystal, Sir Frank Watson Dyson, Cargill Gilston Knott and Ellice Horsburgh.

During the First World War he worked on the Ballistic Department Ordnance Committee at the Royal Arsenal in Woolwich, remotely calculating complex gun angles to fire on hidden or obscured targets, such as at the Gallipoli peninsula.

He returned to the University of Edinburgh after the war. From 1920 he had been President of the Edinburgh Mathematical Society.

In 1934 he was promoted to Reader in Mathematics and remained in this role until his death in 1946. He died in Edinburgh on 28 March 1946.

== Publications ==
- A Course in Interpolation and Numeric Integration for the Mathematical Laboratory (1915)
