= Soviet Student Olympiads =

Student contests in the USSR

Soviet Student Olympiad was an annual set of contests for students in the USSR. There were two separate multi-round competitions every year: for higher education (universities) and general education (starting from 7th to 10th/11th grade). Both competitions had several rounds, and winners from lower rounds would go to the next round. Not only individual members, but teams were awarded too. The main difference between two Olympiads was that the school one had separate threads for every grade, while the university one was for all students.

== History ==
Academic competitions among schools modeled after the Olympic Games emerged in the Soviet Union during the interwar period. They were called "Olympiads" despite the fact that they took place annually rather than once every four years. Leningrad held its first mathematics Olympiad in 1934, in part as a way to select students for universities. Physics and chemistry Olympiads were held in Moscow in 1939.

After World War II, national Olympiads among secondary schools were held in most Warsaw Pact countries. As transnational Olympiads emerged within the Eastern Bloc in the late 1960s, the Soviet Union sent teams to competitions including the International Chemistry Olympiad and the International Physics Olympiad.

== Contest format ==
In the Soviet Union, both the university and secondary school Olympiads had the same format of the contests. Students would come in teams representing their location, e.g. schools or republics. Each contest could have 2-3 parts. For instance, the Republican round of University Olympiads on physics could have three parts: theory, lab and computer modeling. All students were given the same set of problems to solve. They would work on solutions strictly individually - no teamwork was allowed - and then they were scored by judges. Team scores were simply sum of individual member scores. Earlier rounds could take just one round, while the later rounds could span for a week having several parts.

== Olympiads in schools (general education) ==
=== Overview ===
Contests were conducted on many subject of Soviet school curriculum such as Mathematics, Physics, Chemistry, Biology, and others. These Olympiads had several levels based on Soviet Union's administrative structure. These were: School, District (Raion), City, Regional (Oblast), Republican and All-Union contests. These competitions were organized separate for every school grade. Depending on the subject and geographical region the highest round of the Olympiads varied from the All-Union level in Mathematics, Physics, and Chemistry to the Regional level in some other disciplines.

In addition, at certain time Moscow carried out joint "Olympiads in Linguistics and Mathematics" (Олимпиада по языкознанию и математике). After each such Olympiad its problems were printed in the Science and Life (Наука и Жизнь) popular science magazine. There were numerous other Olympiads in Moscow including interdisciplinary "Lomonosov tour".

Besides, there were correspondence Olympiads, in particular, Olympiads carried out by some newspapers, journals and universities. One of the important correspondence Olympiads was organized by the Kvant magazine. Its winners were admitted to the Republican round of the All-Union Physics and Mathematics Olympiads.

Also, there were team contests organized for schools to compete for District, City or Regional honors. There also was a "Physics fight" contest organized by the Moscow State University. In maths, there were contests organized for cities to compete for Republican and All-Union honors.

=== School round ===
Every school was supposed to have a school round competition. Judges were from subject teachers. The winners from this round could compete in the next round, representing their schools. Each grade could send 3-4 students to the next round. This round was usually conducted in the beginning of the school year.

=== District (Raion) round ===
This round was for schools of the administrative division called "Raion" (district), a district of a larger city or of an oblast. Area rounds were organized by RaiONOs (Russian abbreviation for "District Department of People's Education"). Participants would come in teams, but both teams and individual members were recognized and awarded. The winners form teams representing their areas, consisting of 3-4 students from every grade. Usually, area rounds on each subjects took place in different days, so one student could participate in competitions on several subjects. This round was usually conducted in the first half of the school year.

=== City round ===
This round was for students of the big cities, which had several areas (Raions). The winners from the previous round could participate. City round was organized by GorONO, i.e., City Department of People's Education. Again, the winners would form a team and take part in the next round representing their city. This round's contests on different subjects were conducted on the same day, so a student could compete only in one subject. Depending on a demographic situation, in some places this round was skipped. This round was usually conducted in the first half of the school year.

=== Regional (Oblast) round ===
This round was for students of the whole region (oblast). The winners from the previous round could participate. Regional round was organized by OblONO, i.e. regional council of education. Again, the winners would form a team and take part in the next round representing their region (Oblast). They were joined by the winners of the Kvant magazine competition and of the republican and All-Union olympiads of the previous year. This round was usually conducted in the second half of the school year.

=== Republican round ===
This round was a major round, since it recognized the best students of the 15 Republics of the Soviet Union (which are now independent states). The winners from the previous round could participate in teams and individually. Republican round was organized by Republican Ministries of Education. The winners would form a team and take part in the next round representing their republic. This round was usually conducted in the second half of the school year. In Russia the competition was conducted separately in four zones and was known as the zonal round. Moscow, Leningrad, a few specialized mathematical schools, and the schools of the transportation ministry system did not compete at the republican level and sent their teams directly to the All-Union round.

=== All-Union round ===
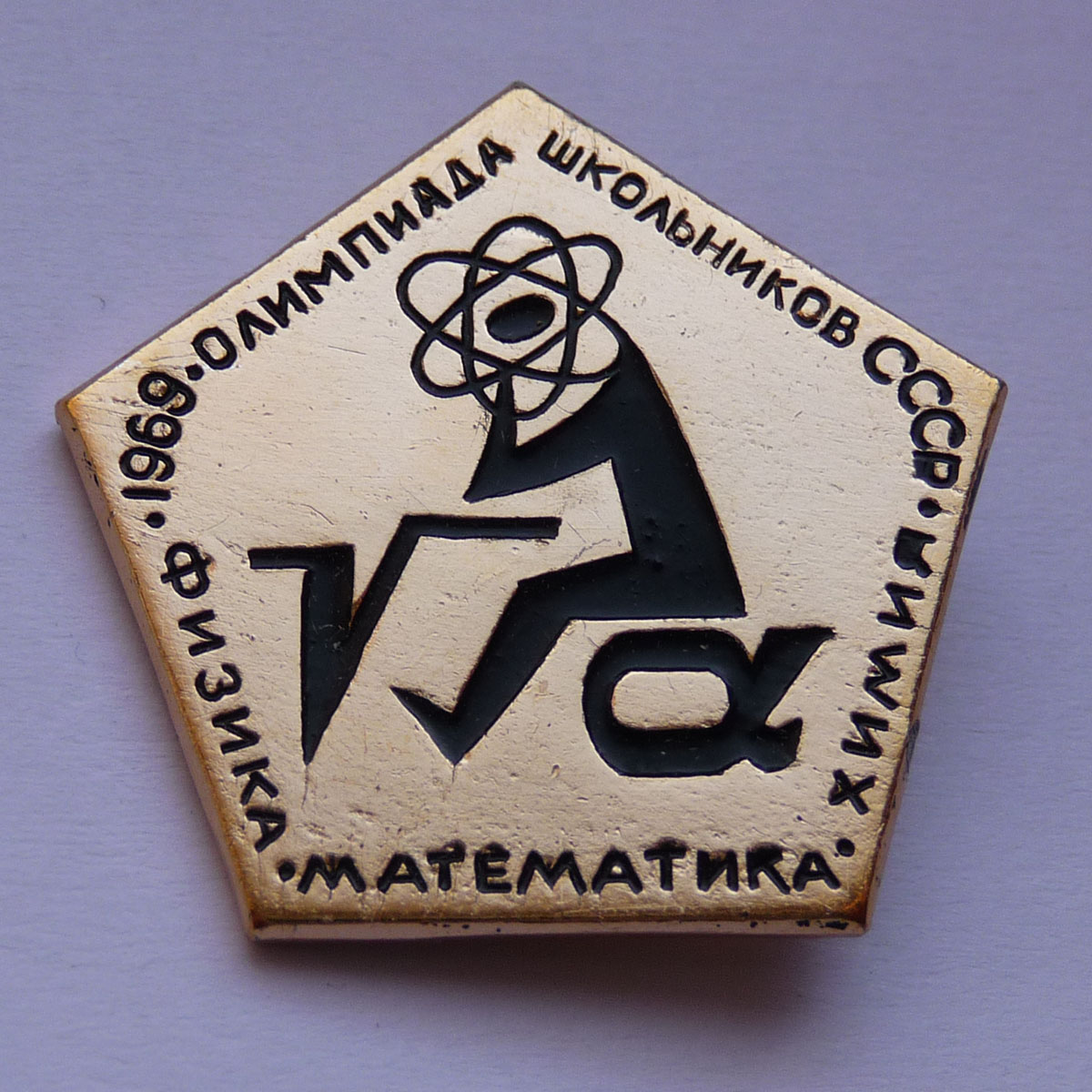
Badge of the participant of III All-Union Mathematical Olympiad of general education students (Kiev, 1969)

This round was a final round for Soviet students. It recognized the best students of the Soviet Union in each subject for every grade. In America, it would be on a national level. The winners from the previous round could participate in teams and individually. This round was organized by Soviet Ministry of Education. This round was usually conducted at the end of the school year.

=== Awards ===
The winners were awarded with the diplomas. Material prizes were minor and usually included scientific books that were otherwise difficult to obtain.

=== Notable winners ===
Vladimir Drinfeld who was later awarded a 1990 Fields Medal for the development of quantum groups is considered by many as the most outstanding "mathematical sportsman" in the history of the All-Union Mathematical Olympiads. His first scientific publication was based on a generalization of an Olympic problem. Many other winners of the Mathematical Olympiad became outstanding mathematicians and physicists. Yuri Matiyasevich who solved the 10th Hilbert problem in 1970 was the absolute winner of the 1964 Olympiad. Grisha Perelman also had an exceptional Olympic record. All three of these national olympiad winners were also selected for the USSR team to the International Mathematical Olympiad and obtained gold medals, with Perelman and Drinfeld achieving perfect scores.

== Olympiads in universities (higher education) ==
=== Overview ===
Contests were conducted on several subject of Soviet higher education curriculum such as Math, Physics, Programming. These Olympiads had several rounds. The rounds were formed following Soviet Union's administrative structure. So, there were University, Republican and All-Union rounds. There was one contest for all students regardless of their year in the university.

=== University round ===
Every university was supposed to have its own competition. Judges were from faculty staff. The winners from this round could compete in the next round, representing their university. This round was usually conducted in the beginning of the school year.

=== Republican round ===
This round was a major round, since it recognized the best university students in each of the republics. The winners from the previous round could participate in teams and individually. Teams had up to a dozen students each. Republican round was organized by Republican Ministries of Education. The winners would form a team and take part in the next round representing their republic. This round was usually conducted in the second half of the school year.

=== All-Union round ===
This round was a final round for Soviet university students. It recognized the best students of the Soviet Union in each subject. In America, it would be on a national level. The winners from the previous round could participate in teams and individually. Teams had 4-5 members. This round was organized by Soviet Ministry of Education. This round was usually conducted in the beginning of the next school year.

=== Awards ===
The winners were awarded with diplomas and minor material prizes in some cases.

== Moscow Olympiads in Linguistics and Mathematics ==
An interesting experiment was olympiads in linguistics and mathematics, at which students were challenged to solve problems in both seemingly non-related domains. It was argued that problems in linguistics often require logical reasoning akin to that required in mathematics. After the olympiads, the problems (and solutions) were published in the Science and Life popular science journal.
