= New Zealand Mathematical Society =

The New Zealand Mathematical Society is a New Zealand-based learned society of mathematicians. It is listed by the Royal Society of New Zealand as the affiliate organisation responsible for mathematics research, and by the International Mathematical Union as the national mathematical society of New Zealand. The total membership in the society has varied from approximately 100 soon after its 1974 foundation to between 200 and 300 at its 25th anniversary in 1999.

The NZMS has its origins in the annual New Zealand Mathematics Colloquium, held beginning in 1966, and in a 1967 visit to New Zealand by Bernhard Neumann during which he promoted connections between the New Zealand and Australian mathematics communities. A drafting committee for the new society was formed at the 1973 colloquium, despite some opposition from the RSNZ's National Committee for Mathematics, and the society was founded in 1974 with David Vere-Jones as founding president.

The society publishes the Newsletter of the New Zealand Mathematical Society three times a year, and co-sponsors the New Zealand Journal of Mathematics (ISSN 1179-4984) with the Department of Mathematics of the University of Auckland. The journal was given its name and co-sponsorship in 1992, and is the successor to a previous publication founded in 1969, the Mathematical Chronicle of the University of Auckland.

Other activities of the society include hosting student competitions, visiting lecturers, and colloquium speakers, and providing travel grants for New Zealand students and mathematicians to attend conferences. A small number of distinguished mathematicians with ties to New Zealand have been named as Honorary Life Members of the society, including Henry Forder, Vaughan Jones, and Bernhard Neumann.

== See also ==
- Forder Lectureship
- Aitken Lectureship
