= K-theory =

Branch of mathematics

In mathematics, K-theory is, roughly speaking, the study of a ring generated by vector bundles over a topological space or scheme. In algebraic topology, it is a cohomology theory known as topological K-theory. In algebra and algebraic geometry, it is referred to as algebraic K-theory. It is also a fundamental tool in the field of operator algebras. It can be seen as the study of certain kinds of invariants of large matrices.

K-theory involves the construction of families of K-functors that map from topological spaces or schemes, or to be even more general: any object of a homotopy category to associated rings; these rings reflect some aspects of the structure of the original spaces or schemes. As with functors to groups in algebraic topology, the reason for this functorial mapping is that it is easier to compute some topological properties from the mapped rings than from the original spaces or schemes. Examples of results gleaned from the K-theory approach include the Grothendieck–Riemann–Roch theorem, Bott periodicity, the Atiyah–Singer index theorem, and the Adams operations.

In high energy physics, K-theory and in particular twisted K-theory have appeared in Type II string theory where it has been conjectured that they classify D-branes, Ramond–Ramond field strengths and also certain spinors on generalized complex manifolds. In condensed matter physics K-theory has been used to classify topological insulators, superconductors and stable Fermi surfaces. For more details, see K-theory (physics).

== Grothendieck completion ==
The Grothendieck completion of an abelian monoid into an abelian group is a necessary ingredient for defining K-theory since all definitions start by constructing an abelian monoid from a suitable category and turning it into an abelian group through this universal construction. Given an abelian monoid $(A,+')$ let $\sim$ be the relation on $A^2 = A \times A$ defined by

$$(a_1,a_2) \sim (b_1,b_2)$$

if there exists a $c\in A$ such that $a_1 +' b_2 +' c = a_2 +' b_1 +' c.$ Then, the set $G(A) = A^2/\sim$ has the structure of a group $(G(A),+)$ where:

$$[(a_1,a_2)] + [(b_1,b_2)] = [(a_1+' b_1,a_2+' b_2)].$$

Equivalence classes in this group should be thought of as formal differences of elements in the abelian monoid. This group $(G(A),+)$ is also associated with a monoid homomorphism $i : A \to G(A)$ given by $a \mapsto [(a, 0)],$ which has a certain universal property.

To get a better understanding of this group, consider some equivalence classes of the abelian monoid $(A,+)$. Here we will denote the identity element of $A$ by $0$ so that $[(0,0)]$ will be the identity element of $(G(A),+).$ First, $(0,0) \sim (n,n)$ for any $n\in A$ since we can set $c = 0$ and apply the equation from the equivalence relation to get $n = n.$ This implies

$$[(a,b)] + [(b,a)] = [(a+b,a+b)] = [(0,0)]$$

hence we have an additive inverse $[(b,a)]$ for each $[(a,b)] \in G(A)$. This should give us the hint that we should be thinking of the equivalence classes $[(a,b)]$ as formal differences $a-b.$ Another useful observation is the invariance of equivalence classes under scaling:

$(a,b) \sim (a+k,b+k)$ for any $k \in A.$

The Grothendieck completion can be viewed as a functor $G:\mathbf{AbMon}\to\mathbf{AbGrp},$ and it has the property that it is left adjoint to the corresponding forgetful functor $U:\mathbf{AbGrp}\to\mathbf{AbMon}.$ That means that, given a morphism $\phi:A \to U(B)$ of an abelian monoid $A$ to the underlying abelian monoid of an abelian group $B,$ there exists a unique abelian group morphism $G(A) \to B.$

=== Example for natural numbers ===
An illustrative example to look at is the Grothendieck completion of $\N$. We can see that $G((\N,+)) = (\Z,+).$ For any pair $(a,b)$ we can find a minimal representative $(a',b')$ by using the invariance under scaling. For example, we can see from the scaling invariance that

$$(4,6) \sim (3,5) \sim (2,4) \sim (1,3) \sim (0,2)$$

In general, if $k := \min\{a,b\}$ then

$(a,b) \sim (a-k,b-k)$ which is of the form $(c,0)$ or $(0,d).$

This shows that we should think of the $(a,0)$ as positive integers and the $(0,b)$ as negative integers.

== Definitions ==
There are a number of basic definitions of K-theory: two coming from topology and two from algebraic geometry.

=== Grothendieck group for compact Hausdorff spaces ===
Given a compact Hausdorff space $X$ consider the set of isomorphism classes of finite-dimensional vector bundles over $X$, denoted $\text{Vect}(X)$ and let the isomorphism class of a vector bundle $\pi:E \to X$ be denoted $[E]$. Since isomorphism classes of vector bundles behave well with respect to direct sums, we can write these operations on isomorphism classes by

$$[E]\oplus[E'] =[E\oplus E']$$

It should be clear that $(\text{Vect}(X),\oplus)$ is an abelian monoid where the unit is given by the trivial vector bundle $\R^0\times X \to X$. We can then apply the Grothendieck completion to get an abelian group from this abelian monoid. This is called the K-theory of $X$ and is denoted $K^0(X)$.

We can use the Serre–Swan theorem and some algebra to get an alternative description of vector bundles over $X$ as projective modules over the ring $C^0(X;\Complex)$ of continuous complex-valued functions. Then, these can be identified with idempotent matrices in some ring of matrices $M_{n\times n}(C^0(X;\Complex))$. We can define equivalence classes of idempotent matrices and form an abelian monoid $\textbf{Idem}(X)$. Its Grothendieck completion is also called $K^0(X)$. One of the main techniques for computing the Grothendieck group for topological spaces comes from the Atiyah–Hirzebruch spectral sequence, which makes it very accessible. The only required computations for understanding the spectral sequences are computing the group $K^0$ for the spheres $S^n$.^{pg 51-110}

=== Grothendieck group of vector bundles in algebraic geometry ===
There is an analogous construction by considering vector bundles in algebraic geometry. For a Noetherian scheme $X$ there is a set $\text{Vect}(X)$ of all isomorphism classes of algebraic vector bundles on $X$. Then, as before, the direct sum $\oplus$ of isomorphisms classes of vector bundles is well-defined, giving an abelian monoid $(\text{Vect}(X),\oplus)$. Then, the Grothendieck group $K^0(X)$ is defined by the application of the Grothendieck construction on this abelian monoid.

=== Grothendieck group of coherent sheaves in algebraic geometry ===
In algebraic geometry, the same construction can be applied to algebraic vector bundles over a smooth scheme. But, there is an alternative construction for any Noetherian scheme $X$. If we look at the isomorphism classes of coherent sheaves $\operatorname{Coh}(X)$ we can mod out by the relation $[\mathcal{E}] = [\mathcal{E}'] + [\mathcal{E}'']$ if there is a short exact sequence

$$0 \to \mathcal{E}' \to \mathcal{E} \to \mathcal{E}'' \to 0.$$

This gives the Grothendieck-group $K_0(X)$ which is isomorphic to $K^0(X)$ if $X$ is smooth. The group $K_0(X)$ is special because there is also a ring structure: we define it as

$$[\mathcal{E}]\cdot[\mathcal{E}'] = \sum(-1)^k \left [\operatorname{Tor}_k^{\mathcal{O}_X}(\mathcal{E}, \mathcal{E}') \right ].$$

Using the Grothendieck–Riemann–Roch theorem, we have that

$$\operatorname{ch} : K_0(X)\otimes \Q \to A(X)\otimes \Q$$

is an isomorphism of rings. Hence we can use $K_0(X)$ for intersection theory.

== Early history ==
The subject can be said to begin with Alexander Grothendieck (1957), who used it to formulate his Grothendieck–Riemann–Roch theorem. It takes its name from the German Klasse, meaning "class". Grothendieck needed to work with coherent sheaves on an algebraic variety X. Rather than working directly with the sheaves, he defined a group using isomorphism classes of sheaves as generators of the group, subject to a relation that identifies any extension of two sheaves with their sum. The resulting group is called K(X) when only locally free sheaves are used, or G(X) when all are coherent sheaves. Either of these two constructions is referred to as the Grothendieck group; K(X) has cohomological behavior and G(X) has homological behavior.

If X is a smooth variety, the two groups are the same. If it is a smooth affine variety, then all extensions of locally free sheaves split, so the group has an alternative definition.

In topology, by applying the same construction to vector bundles, Michael Atiyah and Friedrich Hirzebruch defined K(X) for a topological space X in 1959, and using the Bott periodicity theorem they made it the basis of an extraordinary cohomology theory. It played a major role in the second proof of the Atiyah–Singer index theorem (circa 1962). Furthermore, this approach led to a noncommutative K-theory for C*-algebras.

Already in 1955, Jean-Pierre Serre had used the analogy of vector bundles with projective modules to formulate Serre's conjecture, which states that every finitely generated projective module over a polynomial ring is free; this assertion is correct, but was not settled until 20 years later. (Swan's theorem is another aspect of this analogy.)

== Developments ==
The other historical origin of algebraic K-theory was the work of J. H. C. Whitehead and others on what later became known as Whitehead torsion.

There followed a period in which there were various partial definitions of higher K-theory functors. Finally, two useful and equivalent definitions were given by Daniel Quillen using homotopy theory in 1969 and 1972. A variant was also given by Friedhelm Waldhausen in order to study the algebraic K-theory of spaces, which is related to the study of pseudo-isotopies. Much modern research on higher K-theory is related to algebraic geometry and the study of motivic cohomology.

The corresponding constructions involving an auxiliary quadratic form received the general name L-theory. It is a major tool of surgery theory.

In string theory, the K-theory classification of Ramond–Ramond field strengths and the charges of stable D-branes was first proposed in 1997.

In 2022, Russian mathematician Alexander Ivanovich Efimov constructed a significant generalization of algebraic K-theory, particularly applied to dualizable $(\infty,1)$-categories

== Examples and properties ==
=== K_{0} of a field ===
The easiest example of the Grothendieck group is the Grothendieck group of a point $\text{Spec}(\mathbb{F})$ for a field $\mathbb{F}$. Since a vector bundle over this space is just a finite dimensional vector space, which is a free object in the category of coherent sheaves, hence projective, the monoid of isomorphism classes is $\N$ corresponding to the dimension of the vector space. It is an easy exercise to show that the Grothendieck group is then $\Z$.

=== K_{0} of an Artinian algebra over a field ===
One important property of the Grothendieck group of a Noetherian scheme $X$ is that it is invariant under reduction, hence $K(X) = K(X_{\text{red}})$. Hence the Grothendieck group of any Artinian $\mathbb{F}$-algebra is a direct sum of copies of $\Z$, one for each connected component of its spectrum. For example,
$$K_0 \left(\text{Spec}\left(\frac{\mathbb{F}[x]}{(x^9)}\times\mathbb{F}\right)\right) = \mathbb{Z}\oplus\mathbb{Z}$$

=== K_{0} of projective space ===
One of the most commonly used computations of the Grothendieck group is with the computation of $K(\mathbb{P}^n)$ for projective space over a field. This is because the intersection numbers of a projective $X$ can be computed by embedding $i:X \hookrightarrow \mathbb{P}^n$ and using the push pull formula $i^*([i_*\mathcal{E}]\cdot [i_*\mathcal{F}])$. This makes it possible to do concrete calculations with elements in $K(X)$ without having to explicitly know its structure since
$$K(\mathbb{P}^n) = \frac{\mathbb{Z}[T]}{(T^{n+1})}$$
One technique for determining the Grothendieck group of $\mathbb{P}^n$ comes from its stratification as
$$\mathbb{P}^n = \mathbb{A}^n \coprod \mathbb{A}^{n-1} \coprod \cdots \coprod \mathbb{A}^0$$
since the Grothendieck group of coherent sheaves on affine spaces are isomorphic to $\mathbb{Z}$, and the intersection of $\mathbb{A}^{n-k_1},\mathbb{A}^{n-k_2}$ is generically
$$\mathbb{A}^{n-k_1} \cap \mathbb{A}^{n-k_2} = \mathbb{A}^{n-k_1-k_2}$$
for $k_1 + k_2 \leq n$.

=== K_{0} of a projective bundle ===
Another important formula for the Grothendieck group is the projective bundle formula: given a rank r vector bundle $\mathcal{E}$ over a Noetherian scheme $X$, the Grothendieck group of the projective bundle $\mathbb{P}(\mathcal{E})=\operatorname{Proj}(\operatorname{Sym}^\bullet(\mathcal{E}^\vee))$ is a free $K(X)$-module of rank r with basis $1,\xi,\dots,\xi^{n-1}$. This formula allows one to compute the Grothendieck group of $\mathbb{P}^n_\mathbb{F}$. This make it possible to compute the $K_0$ or Hirzebruch surfaces. In addition, this can be used to compute the Grothendieck group $K(\mathbb{P}^n)$ by observing it is a projective bundle over the field $\mathbb{F}$.

=== K_{0} of singular spaces and spaces with isolated quotient singularities ===
One recent technique for computing the Grothendieck group of spaces with minor singularities comes from evaluating the difference between $K^0(X)$ and $K_0(X)$, which comes from the fact every vector bundle can be equivalently described as a coherent sheaf. This is done using the Grothendieck group of the Singularity category $D_{sg}(X)$ from derived noncommutative algebraic geometry. It gives a long exact sequence starting with
$$\cdots \to K^0(X) \to K_0(X) \to K_{sg}(X) \to 0$$
where the higher terms come from higher K-theory. Note that vector bundles on a singular $X$ are given by vector bundles $E \to X_{sm}$ on the smooth locus $X_{sm} \hookrightarrow X$. This makes it possible to compute the Grothendieck group on weighted projective spaces since they typically have isolated quotient singularities. In particular, if these singularities have isotropy groups $G_i$ then the map
$$K^0(X) \to K_0(X)$$
is injective and the cokernel is annihilated by $\text{lcm}(|G_1|,\ldots, |G_k|)^{n-1}$ for $n = \dim X$.^{pg 3}

=== K_{0} of a smooth projective curve ===
For a smooth projective curve $C$ the Grothendieck group is
$$K_0(C) = \mathbb{Z}\oplus\text{Pic}(C)$$
for Picard group of $C$. This follows from the Brown-Gersten-Quillen spectral sequence^{pg 72} of algebraic K-theory. For a regular scheme of finite type over a field, there is a convergent spectral sequence
$$E_1^{p,q} = \coprod_{x \in X^{(p)}}K^{-p-q}(k(x)) \Rightarrow K_{-p-q}(X)$$
for $X^{(p)}$ the set of codimension $p$ points, meaning the set of integral subschemes $x: Y \to X$ of codimension $p$, and $k(x)$ the algebraic function field of the subscheme. This spectral sequence has the property^{pg 80}
$$E_2^{p,-p} \cong \text{CH}^p(X)$$
for the Chow ring of $X$, essentially giving the computation of $K_0(C)$. Note that because $C$ has no codimension $2$ points, the only nontrivial parts of the spectral sequence are $E_1^{0,q},E_1^{1,q}$, hence
$$\begin{align}
E_\infty^{1,-1}\cong E_2^{1,-1} &\cong \text{CH}^1(C) \\
E_\infty^{0,0} \cong E_2^{0,0} &\cong \text{CH}^0(C)
\end{align}$$
The coniveau filtration can then be used to determine $K_0(C)$ as the desired explicit direct sum since it gives an exact sequence
$$0 \to F^1(K_0(X)) \to K_0(X) \to K_0(X)/F^1(K_0(X)) \to 0$$
where the left hand term is isomorphic to $\text{CH}^1 (C) \cong \text{Pic}(C)$ and the right hand term is isomorphic to $CH^0(C) \cong \mathbb{Z}$. Since $\text{Ext}^1_{\text{Ab}}(\mathbb{Z},G) = 0$, we have the sequence of abelian groups above splits, giving the isomorphism. Note that if $C$ is a smooth projective curve of genus $g$ over $\mathbb{C}$, then
$$K_0(C) \cong \mathbb{Z}\oplus(\mathbb{C}^g/\mathbb{Z}^{2g})$$
Moreover, the techniques above using the derived category of singularities for isolated singularities can be extended to isolated Cohen-Macaulay singularities, giving techniques for computing the Grothendieck group of any singular algebraic curve. This is because reduction gives a generically smooth curve, and all singularities are Cohen-Macaulay.

== Applications ==
=== Virtual bundles ===
One useful application of the Grothendieck-group is to define virtual vector bundles. For example, if we have an embedding of smooth spaces $Y \hookrightarrow X$ then there is a short exact sequence

$$0 \to \Omega_Y \to \Omega_X|_Y \to C_{Y/X} \to 0$$

where $C_{Y/X}$ is the conormal bundle of $Y$ in $X$. If we have a singular space $Y$ embedded into a smooth space $X$ we define the virtual conormal bundle as

$$[\Omega_X|_Y] - [\Omega_Y]$$

Another useful application of virtual bundles is with the definition of a virtual tangent bundle of an intersection of spaces: Let $Y_1,Y_2\subset X$ be projective subvarieties of a smooth projective variety. Then, we can define the virtual tangent bundle of their intersection $Z = Y_1\cap Y_2$ as

$$[T_Z]^{vir} = [T_{Y_1}]|_Z + [T_{Y_2}]|_Z - [T_{X}]|_Z.$$

Kontsevich uses this construction in one of his papers.

=== Chern characters ===
Chern classes can be used to construct a homomorphism of rings from the topological K-theory of a space to (the completion of) its rational cohomology. For a line bundle L, the Chern character ch is defined by

$$\operatorname{ch}(L) = \exp(c_{1}(L)) := \sum_{m=0}^\infty \frac{c_1(L)^m}{m!}.$$

More generally, if $V = L_1 \oplus \dots \oplus L_n$ is a direct sum of line bundles, with first Chern classes $x_i = c_1(L_i),$ the Chern character is defined additively

$$\operatorname{ch}(V)  = e^{x_1} + \dots + e^{x_n} :=\sum_{m=0}^\infty \frac{1}{m!}(x_1^m + \dots + x_n^m).$$

The Chern character is useful in part because it facilitates the computation of the Chern class of a tensor product. The Chern character is used in the Hirzebruch–Riemann–Roch theorem.

== Equivariant K-theory ==
The equivariant algebraic K-theory is an algebraic K-theory associated to the category $\operatorname{Coh}^G(X)$ of equivariant coherent sheaves on an algebraic scheme $X$ with action of a linear algebraic group $G$, via Quillen's Q-construction; thus, by definition,

$$K_i^G(X) = \pi_i(B^+ \operatorname{Coh}^G(X)).$$

In particular, $K_0^G(C)$ is the Grothendieck group of $\operatorname{Coh}^G(X)$. The theory was developed by R. W. Thomason in 1980s. Specifically, he proved equivariant analogs of fundamental theorems such as the localization theorem.

== See also ==
- Bott periodicity
- KK-theory
- KR-theory
- List of cohomology theories
- Algebraic K-theory
- Topological K-theory
- Operator K-theory
- Grothendieck–Riemann–Roch theorem
