= Varghese Mathai =

Australian mathematician

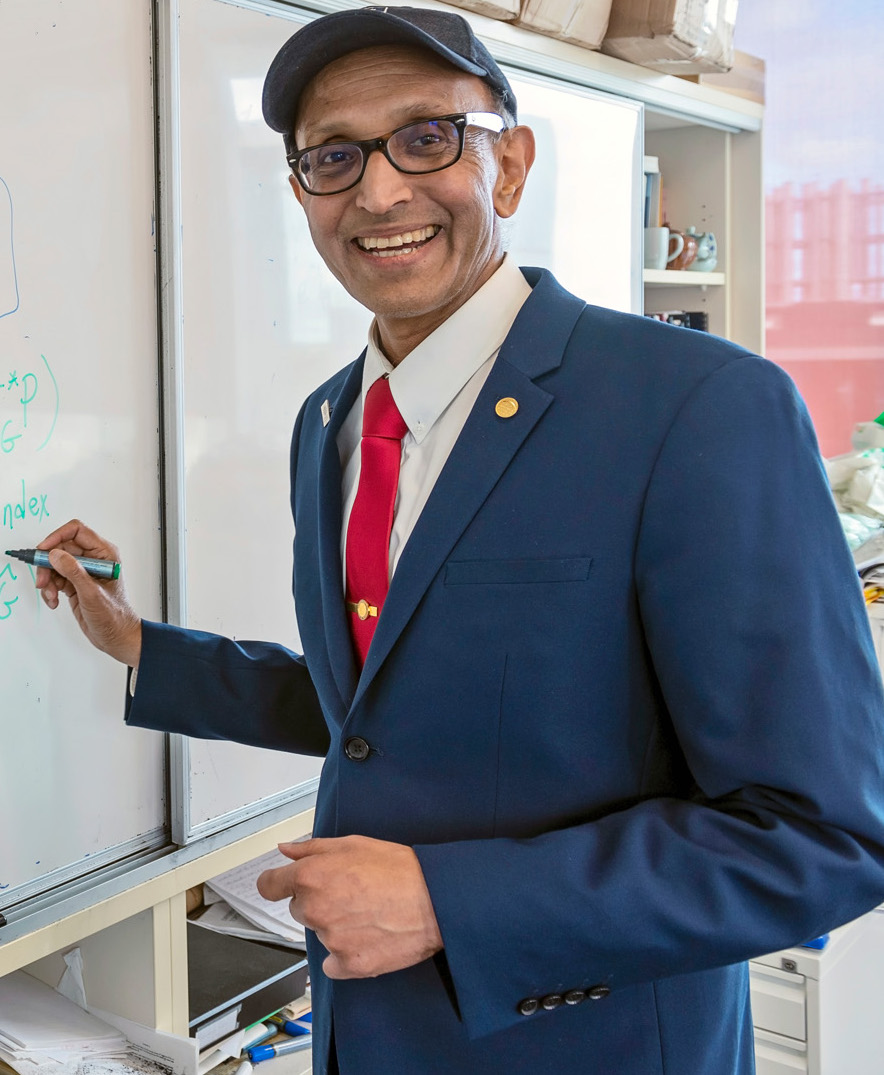
- Born: India
- Education: Illinois Institute of Technology B.A. (1981); Massachusetts Institute of Technology Ph.D. (1986)
- Known for: Mathai-Quillen formalism T-duality in a background flux Fractional and Projective Index theory
- Awards: Australian Mathematical Society Medal (2000) Fellow of the Australian Academy of Science. (2011); ARC Australian Laureate Fellowship. (2018-2023); Hannan Medal (2021) George Szekeres Medal (2021)
- Scientific career
- Fields: Pure mathematics, Mathematical Physics
- Workplaces: Elder Professor of Mathematics, The University of Adelaide
- Thesis: Heat Kernels, Thom Classes and the Index Theorem for Imbeddings (1986)
- Doctoral advisor: Daniel G. Quillen

Mathai Varghese is a mathematician at the University of Adelaide. His first most influential contribution is the Mathai–Quillen formalism, which he formulated together with Daniel Quillen, and which has since found applications in index theory and topological quantum field theory. He was appointed a full professor in 2006. He was appointed Director of the Institute for Geometry and its Applications in 2009. In 2011, he was elected a Fellow of the Australian Academy of Science. In 2013, he was appointed the Elder Professor of Mathematics at the University of Adelaide, and was elected a Fellow of the Royal Society of South Australia. In 2017, he was awarded an ARC Australian Laureate Fellowship. In 2021, he was awarded the prestigious Hannan Medal and Lecture from the Australian Academy of Science, recognizing an outstanding career in Mathematics. In 2021, he was also awarded the prestigious George Szekeres Medal which is the Australian Mathematical Society’s most prestigious medal, recognising research achievement and an outstanding record of promoting and supporting the discipline.

== Biography ==
Mathai studied at Bishop Cotton Boys' School, Bangalore. Mathai received a BA at the Illinois Institute of Technology. He then proceeded to the Massachusetts Institute of Technology, where he was awarded a doctorate under the supervision of Daniel Quillen, a Fields Medallist.

Mathai's work is in the area of geometric analysis. His research interests are in $L^2$ analysis, index theory, and noncommutative geometry. He currently works on mathematical problems that have their roots in physics, for example, topological field theories, fractional quantum Hall effect, and D-branes in the presence of B-fields. The main focus of his research is on the application of noncommutative geometry and index theory to mathematical physics, with particular emphasis on string theory. His current work on index theory is ongoing joint work with Richard Melrose and Isadore Singer, on the fractional analytic index and on the index theorem for projective families of elliptic operators. His current work on string theory is ongoing joint work with Peter Bouwknegt, Jarah Evslin, Keith Hannabuss and Jonathan Rosenberg, on T-duality in the presence of background flux.

The Mathai–Quillen formalism appeared in Topology, shortly after Mathai completed his Ph.D. Using the superconnection formalism of Quillen, they obtained a refinement of the Riemann–Roch formula, which links together the Thom classes in K-theory and cohomology, as an equality on the level of differential forms. This has an interpretation in physics as the computation of the classical and quantum (super) partition functions for the fermionic analogue of a harmonic oscillator with source term. In particular, they obtained a nice Gaussian shape representative of the Thom class in cohomology, which has a peak along the zero section. Its universal representative is obtained using the machinery of equivariant differential forms.

Mathai was awarded the Australian Mathematical Society Medal in 2000. From August 2000 to August 2001, he was also a Clay Mathematics Institute Research Fellow and visiting scientist at the Massachusetts Institute of Technology. From March to June 2006, he was a senior research fellow at the Erwin Schrödinger Institute in Vienna.

== Selected publications ==
- Mathai, Varghese; Quillen, Daniel (1986). "Superconnections, Thom classes and equivariant differential forms". Topology. 25 (1): 85–110. doi:10.1016/0040-9383(86)90007-8.
- Bouwknegt, Peter, Evslin, Jarah and Mathai, Varghese. (2004) "T-duality: Topology Change from H-flux". Communications in Mathematical Physics 249 (2), 383–415.
- Mathai, Varghese; Melrose, Richard B.; Singer, Isadore M. (2006). "Fractional Analytic Index". Journal of Differential Geometry. 74 (2): 265–292. arXiv:math/0402329. doi:10.4310/jdg/1175266205.
