= Snaith (disambiguation) =

== Places ==
- Snaith, town in England
  - Snaith and Cowick
  - RAF Snaith

== People ==
=== with the surname Snaith ===
- Norman Snaith (1898–1982), British bible scholar
- Dan Snaith (1978–), Canadian musician
- Nina Snaith (1974–), British mathematician
- Victor Snaith (1944–), mathematician (Snaith's theorem)
