= Mathai–Quillen formalism =

Formalism for Thom class representation in differential geometry

In mathematics, the Mathai–Quillen formalism is an approach to topological quantum field theory introduced by Atiyah and Jeffrey (1990), based on the Mathai–Quillen form constructed by Mathai and Quillen (1986). In more detail, using the superconnection formalism of Quillen, they obtained a refinement of the Riemann–Roch formula, which links together the Thom classes in K-theory and cohomology, as an equality on the level of differential forms. This has an interpretation in physics as the computation of the classical and quantum (super) partition functions for the fermionic analogue of a harmonic oscillator with source term. In particular, they obtained a nice Gaussian shape representative of the Thom class in cohomology, which has a peak along the zero section.
