= KR-theory =

Mathematics concept

In mathematics, KR-theory is a variant of topological K-theory defined for spaces with an involution. It was introduced by Atiyah (1966), motivated by applications to the Atiyah–Singer index theorem for real elliptic operators.

== Definition ==
A real space is a defined to be a topological space with an involution. A real vector bundle over a real space X is defined to be a complex vector bundle E over X that is also a real space, such that the natural maps from E to X and from $\Complex$×E to E commute with the involution, where the involution acts as complex conjugation on $\Complex$. (This differs from the notion of a complex vector bundle in the category of Z/2Z spaces, where the involution acts trivially on $\Complex$.)

The group KR(X) is the Grothendieck group of finite-dimensional real vector bundles over the real space X.

== Periodicity ==
Similarly to Bott periodicity, the periodicity theorem for KR states that KR^{p,q} = KR^{p+1,q+1}, where KR^{p,q} is suspension with respect to R^{p,q} = R^{q} + iR^{p} (with a switch in the order of p and q), given by

$$KR^{p,q}(X,Y) = KR(X\times B^{p,q},X\times S^{p,q}\cup Y\times B^{p,q})$$

and B^{p,q}, S^{p,q} are the unit ball and sphere in R^{p,q}.
