= Forster–Swan theorem =

The Forster–Swan theorem is a result from commutative algebra that states an upper bound for the minimal number of generators of a finitely generated module $M$ over a commutative Noetherian ring. The usefulness of the theorem stems from the fact, that in order to form the bound, one only needs the minimum number of generators of all localizations $M_{\mathfrak{p}}$.

The theorem was proven in a more restrictive form in 1964 by Otto Forster and then in 1967 generalized by Richard G. Swan to its modern form.

== Forster–Swan theorem ==
Let

- $R$ be a commutative Noetherian ring with one,
- $M$ be a finitely generated $R$-module,
- $\mathfrak{p}$ a prime ideal of $R$.
- $\mu(M)$ and $\mu_{\mathfrak{p}}(M)$ are the minimal number of generators needed to generate the $R$-module $M$ and the $R_{\mathfrak{p}}$-module $M_{\mathfrak{p}}$, respectively.

According to Nakayama's lemma, in order to compute $\mu_{\mathfrak{p}}(M)$ one can compute the dimension of $M_{\mathfrak{p}}/\mathfrak{p}M_{\mathfrak{p}}$ over the field $k(\mathfrak{p})=R_{\mathfrak{p}}/\mathfrak{p}R_{\mathfrak{p}}$, i.e.

$$\mu_{\mathfrak{p}}(M)=\operatorname{dim}_{k(\mathfrak{p})}(M_{\mathfrak{p}}/\mathfrak{p}M).$$

=== Statement ===
Define the local $\mathfrak{p}$-bound

$$b_{\mathfrak{p}}(M):=\mu_{\mathfrak{p}}(M)+\operatorname{dim}(R/\mathfrak{p}),$$

then the following holds

$$\mu(M)\leq \sup_{\mathfrak{p}}\;\{b_{\mathfrak{p}}(M)\;|\;\mathfrak{p}\;\text{is prime},\;M_{\mathfrak{p}}\neq 0\}.$$

== Bibliography ==
- Rao, R.A.; Ischebeck, F. (2005). Ideals and Reality: Projective Modules and Number of Generators of Ideals. Deutschland: Physica-Verlag.
- Swan, Richard G. (1967). "The number of generators of a module". Math. Mathematische Zeitschrift. 102 (4): 318–322. doi:10.1007/BF01110912.
