= Quillen metric =

Metric on a determinant line bundle

In mathematics, and especially differential geometry, the Quillen metric is a metric on the determinant line bundle of a family of operators. It was introduced by Daniel Quillen for certain elliptic operators over a Riemann surface, and generalized to higher-dimensional manifolds by Jean-Michel Bismut and Dan Freed.

The Quillen metric was used by Quillen to give a differential-geometric interpretation of the ample line bundle over the moduli space of vector bundles on a compact Riemann surface, known as the Quillen determinant line bundle. It can be seen as defining the Chern–Weil representative of the first Chern class of this ample line bundle. The Quillen metric construction and its generalizations were used by Bismut and Freed to compute the holonomy of certain determinant line bundles of Dirac operators, and this holonomy is associated to certain anomaly cancellations in Chern–Simons theory predicted by Edward Witten.

The Quillen metric was also used by Simon Donaldson in 1987 in a new inductive proof of the Hitchin–Kobayashi correspondence for projective algebraic manifolds, published one year after the resolution of the correspondence by Shing-Tung Yau and Karen Uhlenbeck for arbitrary compact Kähler manifolds.

== Determinant line bundle of a family of operators ==
Suppose $D_t$ are a family of Fredholm operators $D_t : V\to W$ between Hilbert spaces, varying continuously with respect to $t\in X$ for some topological space $X$. Since each of these operators is Fredholm, the kernel and cokernel are finite-dimensional. Thus there are assignments

$$t\mapsto \ker D_t,\quad t \mapsto \text{coker} D_t$$

which define families of vector spaces over $X$. Despite the assumption that the operators $D_t$ vary continuously in $t$, these assignments of vector spaces do not form vector bundles over the topological space $X$, because the dimension of the kernel and cokernel may jump discontinuously for a family of differential operators. However, the index of a differential operator, the dimension of the kernel subtracted by the dimension of the cokernel, is an invariant up to continuous deformations. That is, the assignment

$$t\mapsto \text{ind}(D_t) := \dim \ker D_t - \dim \text{coker} D_t$$

is a constant function on $X$. Since it is not possible to take a difference of vector bundles, it is not possible to combine the families of kernels and cokernels of $D_t$ into a vector bundle. However, in the K-theory of $X$, formal differences of vector bundles may be taken, and associated to the family $D_t$ is an element

$$\text{ind}(D_t) = [t\mapsto \ker D_t - \text{coker} D_t] \in K(X).$$

This virtual index bundle contains information about the analytical properties of the family $D_t$, and its virtual rank, the difference of dimensions, may be computed using the Atiyah–Singer index theorem, provided the operators $D_t$ are elliptic differential operators.

Whilst the virtual index bundle is not a genuine vector bundle over the parameter space $X$, it is possible to pass to a genuine line bundle constructed out of $\text{ind} (D_t)$. For any $t$, the determinant line of $D_t: V \to W$ is defined as the one-dimensional vector space

$$\det D_t := \left(\Lambda^{\dim \text{coker} D_t} \text{coker} D_t\right)^* \otimes \Lambda^{\dim \ker D_t} \ker D_t.$$

One defines the determinant line bundle of the family $D_t$ as the fibrewise determinant of the virtual index bundle,

$$\mathcal{L}= \det \text{ind} (D_t)$$

which over each $t\in X$ has fibre given by the determinant line $\det D_t$. This genuine line bundle over the topological space $X$ has the same first Chern class as the virtual index bundle, and this may be computed from the index theorem.

== Quillen metric ==
The Quillen metric was introduced by Quillen, and is a Hermitian metric on the determinant line bundle of a certain family of differential operators parametrised by the space of unitary connections on a complex vector bundle over a compact Riemann surface. In this section the construction is sketched.

Given a Fredholm operator $D: V\to W$ between complex Hilbert spaces, one naturally obtains Hermitian inner products on the finite-dimensional vector spaces $\ker D$ and $\text{coker} D$ by restriction. These combine to give a Hermitian inner product, $h$ say, on the determinant line $\det D$, a one-dimensional complex vector space. However, when one has a family $D_t$ of such operators parametrised by a smooth manifold $X$, the assignment $t \mapsto h_t$ of Hermitian inner products on each fibre of the determinant line bundle $\mathcal{L}$ does not define a smooth Hermitian metric. Indeed, in this setting care needs to be taken that the line bundle $\mathcal{L}$ is in fact a smooth line bundle, and Quillen showed that one can construct a smooth trivialisation of $\mathcal{L}$.

The natural Hermitian metrics $h_t$ may develop singular behaviour whenever the eigenvalues $\lambda$ of the Laplacian operators $D_t^* D_t$ cross or become equal, combining smaller eigenspaces into larger eigenspaces. In order to cancel out this singular behaviour, one must regularise the Hermitian metric $h$ by multiplying by an infinite determinant

$$\Pi \lambda = \exp(-\zeta'(0))$$

where $\zeta(s)$ is the zeta function operator of the Laplacian $D_t^* D_t$, defined by as the meromorphic continuation to $s=0$ of

$$\zeta(s) = \sum_{\lambda} \lambda^{-s}$$

which is defined for $\text{Re}(s)>1$. This zeta function and infinite determinant is intimately related to the analytic torsion of the Laplacian $D_t^* D_t$. In the general setting studied by Bismut and Freed, some care needs to be taken in the definition of this infinite determinant, which is defined in terms of a supertrace.

Quillen considered the affine space $\mathcal{A}$ of unitary connections on a smooth complex vector bundle $E\to \Sigma$ over a compact Riemann surface, and the family of differential operators $\bar \partial_A : L_1^2 (E) \to L^2(\Omega^{0,1}(E))$, the Dolbeault operators of the Chern connections $A\in \mathcal{A}$, acting between Sobolev spaces of sections of $E$, which are Hilbert spaces. Each operator $\bar \partial_A$ is elliptic, and so by elliptic regularity its kernel consists of smooth sections of $E$. Indeed $\ker \bar \partial_A$ consists of the holomorphic sections of $E$ with respect to the holomorphic structure induced by the Dolbeault operator $\bar \partial_A$. Quillen's construction produces a metric on the determinant line bundle of this family, $\mathcal{L} \to \mathcal{A}$, and Quillen showed that the curvature form of the Chern connection associated to the Quillen metric is given by the Atiyah–Bott symplectic form on the space of unitary connections, previously discovered by Michael Atiyah and Raoul Bott in their study of the Yang–Mills equations over Riemann surfaces.

=== Curvature ===
Associated to the Quillen metric and its generalised construction by Bismut and Freed is a unitary connection, and to this unitary connection is associated its curvature form. The associated cohomology class of this curvature form is predicted by the families version of the Atiyah–Singer index theorem, and the agreement of this prediction with the curvature form was proven by Bismut and Freed. In the setting of Riemann surfaces studied by Quillen, this curvature is shown to be given by

$$\Omega_A(a,b) = \int_\Sigma \text{trace}(a\wedge b)$$

where $A\in \mathcal{A}$ is a unitary connection and $a,b\in \Omega^1(\text{End}(E))$ are tangent vectors to $\mathcal{A}$ at $A$. This symplectic form is the Atiyah–Bott symplectic form first discovered by Atiyah and Bott. Using this symplectic form, Atiyah and Bott demonstrated that the Narasimhan–Seshadri theorem could be interpreted as an infinite-dimensional version of the Kempf–Ness theorem from geometric invariant theory, and in this setting the Quillen metric plays the role of the Kähler metric which allows the symplectic reduction of $\mathcal{A}$ to be taken.

In Donaldson's new proof of the Hitchin–Kobayashi correspondence for projective algebraic manifolds, he explained how to construct a determinant line bundle over the space of unitary connections on a vector bundle over an arbitrary algebraic manifold which has the higher-dimensional Atiyah–Bott symplectic form as its curvature:

$$\Omega_A(a,b) = \int_M \text{trace} (a\wedge b) \wedge \omega^{n-1}$$

where $(M,\omega)$ is a projective algebraic manifold. This construction was used by Donaldson in an inductive proof of the correspondence.

== Generalisations and alternate notions ==
The Quillen metric is primarily considered in the study of holomorphic vector bundles over Riemann surfaces or higher dimensional complex manifolds, and in Bismut and Freeds generalisation to the study of families of elliptic operators. In the study of moduli spaces of algebraic varieties and complex manifolds, it is possible to construct determinant line bundles on the space of almost-complex structures on a fixed smooth manifold $(M,\omega)$ which induce a Kähler structure with form $\omega$. Just as the Quillen metric for vector bundles was related to the stability of vector bundles in the work of Atiyah and Bott and Donaldson, one may relate the Quillen metric for the determinant bundle for manifolds to the stability theory of manifolds. Indeed, the K-energy functional defined by Toshiki Mabuchi, which has critical points given by constant scalar curvature Kähler metrics, can be interpreted as the log-norm functional for a Quillen metric on the space of Kähler metrics.
