= Nakayama's lemma =

Theorem in algebra mathematics

In mathematics, more specifically abstract algebra and commutative algebra, Nakayama's lemma — also known as the Krull–Azumaya theorem — governs the interaction between the Jacobson radical of a ring (typically a commutative ring) and its finitely generated modules. Informally, the lemma immediately gives a precise sense in which finitely generated modules over a commutative ring behave like vector spaces over a field. It is an important tool in algebraic geometry, because it allows local data on algebraic varieties, in the form of modules over local rings, to be studied pointwise as vector spaces over the residue field of the ring.

The lemma is named after the Japanese mathematician Tadashi Nakayama and introduced in its present form in Nakayama (1951), although it was first discovered in the special case of ideals in a commutative ring by Wolfgang Krull and then in general by Goro Azumaya (1951). In the commutative case, the lemma is a simple consequence of a generalized form of the Cayley–Hamilton theorem, an observation made in classic texts by Zariski–Samuel (1958) and Atiyah–Macdonald (1969). The special case of the noncommutative version of the lemma for right ideals appears in Nathan Jacobson (1945), and so the noncommutative Nakayama lemma is sometimes known as the Jacobson–Azumaya theorem. The latter has various applications in the theory of Jacobson radicals.

== Statement ==
Let $R$ be a commutative ring with identity 1. The following is Nakayama's lemma, as stated in Matsumura (1989):

Statement 1: Let $I$ be an ideal in $R,$ and $M$ a finitely generated module over $R.$ If $IM=M,$ then there exists $r \in R$ with $r \equiv 1\; (\operatorname{mod} I)$ such that $rM = 0.$

This is proven below. A useful mnemonic for Nakayama's lemma is "$IM = M \implies im = m$". This summarizes the following alternative formulation:

Statement 2: Let $I$ be an ideal in $R,$ and $M$ a finitely generated module over $R.$ If $IM=M,$ then there exists an $i \in I$ such that $im = m$ for all $m \in M.$

Proof: Take $i = 1 - r$ in Statement 1.

The following corollary is also known as Nakayama's lemma, and it is in this form that it most often appears.

Statement 3: If $M$ is a finitely generated module over $R,$ $\mathrm{J}(R)$ is the Jacobson radical of $R,$ and $\mathrm{J}(R)M=M,$ then $M = 0.$

Proof: $1 - r$ (with $r$ as in Statement 1) is in the Jacobson radical so $r$ is invertible. Thus $M = (r^{-1})(rM)=0.$

More generally, one has that $\mathrm{J}(R)M$ is a superfluous submodule of $M$ when $M$ is finitely generated.

Statement 4: If $M$ is a finitely generated module over $R,$ $N$ is a submodule of $M,$ and $M = N + \mathrm{J}(R)M,$ then $M = N.$

Proof: Apply Statement 3 to $M/N.$

The following result manifests Nakayama's lemma in terms of generators.

Statement 5: If $M$ is a finitely generated module over $R$ and the images of elements $m_1,\cdots,m_n$ of $M$ in $M/\mathrm{J}(R)M$ generate $M/\mathrm{J}(R)M$ as an $R/\mathrm{J}(R)$-module, then $m_1,\cdots,m_n$ also generate $M$ as an $R$-module.

Proof: Apply Statement 4 to $\textstyle{N=\sum_{i} Rm_i}.$

If one assumes instead that $R$ is complete and $M$ is separated with respect to the $I$-adic topology for an ideal $I$ in $R$, this last statement holds with $I$ in place of $\mathrm{J}(R)$ and without assuming in advance that $M$ is finitely generated. Here separatedness means that the $I$-adic topology satisfies the T_{1} separation axiom, and is equivalent to $\textstyle{\bigcap_{k=1}^\infty I^k M = 0.}$

== Consequences ==
=== Local rings ===
In the special case of a finitely generated module $M$ over a local ring $R$ with maximal ideal $\mathfrak{m}$, the quotient $M/\mathfrak{m}M$ is a vector space over the field $R/\mathfrak{m}$. Statement 5 then implies that a basis of $M/\mathfrak{m}M$ lifts to a minimal set of generators of $M$. Conversely, every minimal set of generators of $M$ is obtained in this way, and any two such sets of generators are related by an invertible matrix with entries in the ring.

==== Geometric interpretation ====
In this form, Nakayama's lemma takes on concrete geometrical significance. Local rings arise in geometry as the germs of functions at a point. Finitely generated modules over local rings arise quite often as germs of sections of vector bundles. Working at the level of germs rather than points, the notion of a finite-dimensional vector bundle gives way to that of a coherent sheaf. Informally, Nakayama's lemma says that one can still regard a coherent sheaf as coming from a vector bundle in some sense. More precisely, let $\mathcal{M}$ be a coherent sheaf of $\mathcal{O}_X$-modules over an arbitrary scheme $X$. The stalk of $\mathcal{M}$ at a point $p\in X$, denoted by $\mathcal{M}_p$, is a module over the local ring $(\mathcal{O}_{X,p},{\displaystyle {\mathfrak {m}}_{p}})$ and the fiber of $\mathcal{M}$ at $p$ is the vector space $\mathcal{M}(p) = \mathcal{M}_p/\mathfrak{m}_p\mathcal{M}_p$. Nakayama's lemma implies that a basis of the fiber $\mathcal{M}(p)$ lifts to a minimal set of generators of $\mathcal{M}_p$. That is:

- Any basis of the fiber of a coherent sheaf $\mathcal{M}$ at a point comes from a minimal basis of local sections.

Reformulating this geometrically, if $\mathcal{M}$ is a locally free $\mathcal{O}_X$-module representing a vector bundle $E \to X$, and if we take a basis of the vector bundle at a point in the scheme $X$, this basis can be lifted to a basis of sections of the vector bundle in some neighborhood of the point. We can organize this data diagrammatically

$$\begin{matrix}
E|_p & \to & E|_U & \to & E \\
\downarrow & & \downarrow & & \downarrow \\
p & \to & U & \to & X
\end{matrix}$$

where $E|_p$ is an n-dimensional vector space, to say a basis in $E|_p$ (which is a basis of sections of the bundle $E_p \to p$) can be lifted to a basis of sections $E|_U \to U$ for some neighborhood $U$ of $p$.

=== Going up and going down ===
The going up theorem is essentially a corollary of Nakayama's lemma. It asserts:

- Let $R \hookrightarrow S$ be an integral extension of commutative rings, and $\mathfrak{p}$ a prime ideal of $R$. Then there is a prime ideal $\mathfrak{q}$ in $S$ such that $\mathfrak{q}\cap R = \mathfrak{p}$. Moreover, $\mathfrak{q}$ can be chosen to contain any prime $\mathfrak{q}_1$ of $S$ such that $\mathfrak{q}_1\cap R \subset \mathfrak{p}$.

=== Module epimorphisms ===
Nakayama's lemma makes precise one sense in which finitely generated modules over a commutative ring are like vector spaces over a field. The following consequence of Nakayama's lemma gives another way in which this is true:

- If $M$ is a finitely generated $R$-module and $f:M\to M$ is a surjective endomorphism, then $f$ is an isomorphism.

Over a local ring, one can say more about module epimorphisms:

- Suppose that $R$ is a local ring with maximal ideal $\mathfrak{m}$, and $M,N$ are finitely generated $R$-modules. If $\phi:M\to N$ is an $R$-linear map such that the quotient $\phi_\mathfrak{m}:M/\mathfrak{m}M \to N/\mathfrak{m}N$ is surjective, then $\phi$ is surjective.

=== Homological versions ===
Nakayama's lemma also has several versions in homological algebra. The above statement about epimorphisms can be used to show:

- Let $M$ be a finitely generated module over a local ring. Then $M$ is projective if and only if it is free. This can be used to compute the Grothendieck group of any local ring $R$ as $K(R) = \mathbb{Z}$.

A geometrical and global counterpart to this is the Serre–Swan theorem, relating projective modules and coherent sheaves.

More generally, one has

- Let $R$ be a local ring and $M$ a finitely generated module over $R$. Then the projective dimension of $M$ over $R$ is equal to the length of every minimal free resolution of $M$. Moreover, the projective dimension is equal to the global dimension of $M$, which is by definition the smallest integer $i \geq 0$ such that

$$\operatorname{Tor}_{i+1}^R(k,M) = 0.$$

Here $k$ is the residue field of $R$ and $\text{Tor}$ is the tor functor.

=== Inverse function theorem ===
Nakayama's lemma is used to prove a version of the inverse function theorem in algebraic geometry:

- Let $f: X \to Y$ be a projective morphism between quasi-projective varieties. Then $f$ is an isomorphism if and only if it is a bijection and the differential $df_p$ is injective for all $p \in X$.

== Proof ==
A standard proof of Nakayama's lemma (Statement 1) uses the following technique popularized by Atiyah & Macdonald (1969). We first prove the following assertion:

- Let M be an R-module generated by n elements, and let $\varphi\colon M\to M$ be an R-linear map. Then for any ideal I of R such that $\varphi(M)\subseteq IM,$ there is a monic polynomial $p(t) = t^n + p_1t^{n-1} +\cdots + p_n$ with $p_k\in I^k,$ such that $p(\varphi)=0$ as an endomorphism of M.

This assertion is precisely a generalized version of the Cayley–Hamilton theorem, and the proof proceeds along the same lines.

Proof of assertion: On the generators $x_i$ of M, one has a relation of the form

$$\varphi(x_i) = \sum_{j=1}^n a_{ij}x_j$$

where $a_{ij}\in I$. Thus

$$\sum_{j=1}^n\left(\varphi\delta_{ij} - a_{ij}\right)x_j = 0,$$

where $\delta_{ij}$ in the Kronecker delta, and we are now regarding M as an $R[\varphi]$-module with $\varphi x_i=\varphi(x_i).$ The required result follows by multiplying by the adjugate of the matrix $[\varphi\delta_{ij}-a_{ij}]$ and invoking Cramer's rule. One finds then that $\det(\varphi\delta_{ij}-a_{ij})=0$, so the polynomial

$$p(t) = \det(t\delta_{ij}-a_{ij})$$

has the required properties. This proves the assertion.

To complete the proof of Nakayama's lemma, assume that $IM=M$ and take $\varphi$ to be the identity on M. Then define polynomial p as above. Then

$$r=p(1) = 1+p_1+p_2+\cdots+p_n$$

has the required properties, $r \equiv 1\; (\operatorname{mod} I)$ and $rM = 0$.

== Noncommutative case ==
A version of the lemma holds for right modules over non-commutative unital rings R. The resulting theorem is sometimes known as the Jacobson–Azumaya theorem.

Let J(R) be the Jacobson radical of R. If U is a right module over a ring, R, and I is a right ideal in R, then define U·I to be the set of all (finite) sums of elements of the form u·i, where · is simply the action of R on U. Necessarily, U·I is a submodule of U.

If V is a maximal submodule of U, then U/V is simple. So U·J(R) is necessarily a subset of V, by the definition of J(R) and the fact that U/V is simple. Thus, if U contains at least one (proper) maximal submodule, U·J(R) is a proper submodule of U. However, this need not hold for arbitrary modules U over R, for U need not contain any maximal submodules. Naturally, if U is a Noetherian module, this holds. If R is Noetherian, and U is finitely generated, then U is a Noetherian module over R, and the conclusion is satisfied. Somewhat remarkable is that the weaker assumption, namely that U is finitely generated as an R-module (and no finiteness assumption on R), is sufficient to guarantee the conclusion. This is essentially the statement of Nakayama's lemma.

Precisely, one has:

Nakayama's lemma: Let U be a finitely generated right module over a (unital) ring R. If U is a non-zero module, then U·J(R) is a proper submodule of U.

=== Proof ===
Let $X$ be a finite subset of $U$, minimal with respect to the property that it generates $U$. Since $U$ is non-zero, this set $X$ is nonempty. Denote every element of $X$ by $x_i$ for $i\in \{1,\ldots,n\}$. Since $X$ generates $U$,$\sum_{i=1}^n x_i R = U$.

Suppose $U\cdot \operatorname J(R) = U$, to obtain a contradiction. Then every element $u \in U$ can be expressed as a finite combination $u=\sum\limits_{s=1}^{m}u_{s}j_{s}$ for some $m\in\mathbb{N},\, u_s\in U,\, j_s \in \operatorname J(R), \,s=1,\dots,m$.

Each $u_s$ can be further decomposed as $u_s = \sum\limits_{i=1}^{n} x_i r_{i,s}$ for some $r_{i,s}\in R$. Therefore, we have

$u=\sum_{s=1}^{m}\left( \sum_{i=1}^{n}x_i r_{i,s} \right)j_s = \sum\limits_{i=1}^{n}x_i \left(\sum_{s=1}^{m}r_{i,s}j_s\right)$.

Since $\operatorname J(R)$ is a (two-sided) ideal in $R$, we have $\sum_{s=1}^{m}r_{i,s}j_s \in \operatorname J(R)$ for every $i\in\{1,\dots,n\}$, and thus this becomes

$u= \sum_{i=1}^n x_i k_i$ for some $k_i\in \operatorname J(R)$, $i=1,\dots,n$.

Putting $u=\sum_{i=1}^{n}x_i$ and applying distributivity, we obtain

$$\sum_{i=1}^n x_i (1 - k_i) = 0$$.

Choose some $j\in\{1,\dots,n\}$. If the right ideal $(1-k_j) R$ were proper, then it would be contained in a maximal right ideal $M\neq R$ and both $1-k_j$ and $k_j$ would belong to $M$, leading to a contradiction (note that $\operatorname J(R)\subseteq M$ by the definition of the Jacobson radical). Thus $(1-k_j)R=R$ and $1-k_j$ has a right inverse $(1-k_j)^{-1}$ in $R$. We have

$$\sum_{i=1}^n x_i (1 - k_i) (1 - k_j)^{-1} = 0$$.

Therefore,

$$\sum_{i\neq j} x_i (1 - k_i) (1 - k_j)^{-1} = -x_j$$.

Thus $x_j$ is a linear combination of the elements from $X\setminus\{x_j\}$. This contradicts the minimality of $X$ and establishes the result.

== Graded version ==
There is also a graded version of Nakayama's lemma. Let R be a ring that is graded by the ordered monoid of non-negative integers, and let $R_+$ denote the ideal generated by positively graded elements. Then if M is a graded module over R for which $M_i = 0$ for i sufficiently negative (in particular, if M is finitely generated and R does not contain elements of negative degree) such that $R_+M = M$, then $M = 0$. Of particular importance is the case that R is a polynomial ring with the standard grading, and M is a finitely generated module.

The proof is much easier than in the ungraded case: taking i to be the least integer such that $M_i \ne 0$, we see that $M_i$ does not appear in $R_+M$, so either $M \ne R_+M$, or such an i does not exist, i.e., $M = 0$.

== See also ==
- Module theory
- Serre–Swan theorem

== Links ==
- How to understand Nakayama's Lemma and its Corollaries
