= Richard Swan =

American mathematician (born 1933)

Richard Gordon Swan
- Born: 1933 (age 92–93)
- Education: Princeton University
- Known for: Serre–Swan theorem, Forster–Swan theorem
- Awards: William Lowell Putnam Mathematical Competition, Cole Prize

Richard Gordon Swan (/swɑːn/; born 1933) is an American mathematician who is known for the Serre–Swan theorem relating the geometric notion of vector bundles to the algebraic concept of projective modules, and for the Swan representation, an l-adic projective representation of a Galois group. His work has mainly been in the area of algebraic K-theory.

== Education and career ==
As an undergraduate at Princeton University, Swan was one of five winners in the William Lowell Putnam Mathematical Competition in 1952. He earned his Ph.D. in 1957 from Princeton University under the supervision of John Coleman Moore.

In 1969 he proved in full generality what is now known as the Stallings–Swan theorem. He is the Louis Block Professor Emeritus of Mathematics at the University of Chicago.

His doctoral students at Chicago include Charles Weibel, also known for his work in K-theory.

Together with Otto Forster he proved the Forster–Swan theorem.

== Awards and honors ==
In 1970 Swan was awarded the American Mathematical Society's Cole Prize in Algebra.

== Books ==
- Swan, R. G. (1964). The Theory of Sheaves. Chicago lectures in mathematics. Chicago: The University of Chicago Press.
- Swan, R. G. (1968). Algebraic K-theory. Lecture Notes in Mathematics. Vol. 76. Berlin, New York: Springer-Verlag. doi:10.1007/BFb0080281. ISBN 978-3-540-04245-7. MR 0245634.
- Swan, Richard G. (1970). K-Theory of Finite Groups and Orders. Lecture Notes in Mathematics. Vol. 149. Notes by E. Graham Evans. Berlin, New York: Springer-Verlag. doi:10.1007/BFb0059150. ISBN 978-3-540-04938-8. MR 0308195.
