= Snaith's theorem =

Theorem in algebraic topology about the complex K-theory spectrum

In algebraic topology, a branch of mathematics, Snaith's theorem, introduced by Victor Snaith, identifies the complex K-theory spectrum with the localization of the suspension spectrum of $\mathbb{C}P^\infty$ away from the Bott element.
