= Topological K-theory =

Branch of algebraic topology

In mathematics, topological K-theory is a branch of algebraic topology. It was founded to study vector bundles on topological spaces, by means of ideas now recognised as (general) K-theory that were introduced by Alexander Grothendieck. The early work on topological K-theory is due to Michael Atiyah and Friedrich Hirzebruch.

== Definitions ==
Let X be a compact Hausdorff space and $k= \R$ or $\Complex$. Then $K_k(X)$ is defined to be the Grothendieck group of the commutative monoid of isomorphism classes of finite-dimensional k-vector bundles over X under Whitney sum. Tensor product of bundles gives K-theory a commutative ring structure. Without subscripts, $K(X)$ usually denotes complex K-theory whereas real K-theory is sometimes written as $KO(X)$. The remaining discussion is focused on complex K-theory.

As a first example, note that the K-theory of a point is the integers. This is because vector bundles over a point are trivial and thus classified by their rank and the Grothendieck group of the natural numbers is the integers.

There is also a reduced version of K-theory, $\widetilde{K}(X)$, defined for X a compact pointed space (cf. reduced homology). This reduced theory is intuitively K(X) modulo trivial bundles. It is defined as the group of stable equivalence classes of bundles. Two bundles E and F are said to be stably isomorphic if there are trivial bundles $\varepsilon_1$ and $\varepsilon_2$, so that $E \oplus \varepsilon_1 \cong F\oplus \varepsilon_2$. This equivalence relation results in a group since every vector bundle can be completed to a trivial bundle by summing with its orthogonal complement. Alternatively, $\widetilde{K}(X)$ can be defined as the kernel of the map $K(X)\to K(x_0) \cong \Z$ induced by the inclusion of the base point x_{0} into X.

K-theory forms a multiplicative (generalized) cohomology theory as follows. The short exact sequence of a pair of pointed spaces (X, A)

$$\widetilde{K}(X/A) \to \widetilde{K}(X) \to \widetilde{K}(A)$$

extends to a long exact sequence

$$\cdots \to \widetilde{K}(SX) \to \widetilde{K}(SA) \to \widetilde{K}(X/A) \to \widetilde{K}(X) \to \widetilde{K}(A).$$

Let S^{n} be the n-th reduced suspension of a space and then define

$$\widetilde{K}^{-n}(X):=\widetilde{K}(S^nX), \qquad n\geq 0.$$

Negative indices are chosen so that the coboundary maps increase dimension.

It is often useful to have an unreduced version of these groups, simply by defining:

$$K^{-n}(X)=\widetilde{K}^{-n}(X_+).$$

Here $X_+$ is $X$ with a disjoint basepoint labeled '+' adjoined.

Finally, the Bott periodicity theorem as formulated below extends the theories to positive integers.

== Properties ==
- $K^n$ (respectively, $\widetilde{K}^n$) is a contravariant functor from the homotopy category of (pointed) spaces to the category of commutative rings. Thus, for instance, the K-theory over contractible spaces is always $\Z.$
- The spectrum of K-theory is $BU\times\Z$ (with the discrete topology on $\Z$), i.e. $K(X) \cong [ X_+, \Z \times BU ],$ where [ , ] denotes pointed homotopy classes and BU is the colimit of the classifying spaces of the unitary groups: $BU(n) \cong \operatorname{Gr} (n, \Complex^{\infty} ).$ Similarly,
  $$\widetilde{K}(X) \cong [X, \Z \times BU].$$
  For real K-theory use BO.
- There is a natural ring homomorphism $K^0(X) \to H^{2*}(X, \Q),$ the Chern character, such that $K^0(X) \otimes \Q \to H^{2*}(X, \Q)$ is an isomorphism.
- The equivalent of the Steenrod operations in K-theory are the Adams operations. They can be used to define characteristic classes in topological K-theory.
- The Splitting principle of topological K-theory allows one to reduce statements about arbitrary vector bundles to statements about sums of line bundles.
- The Thom isomorphism theorem in topological K-theory is
  $$K(X)\cong\widetilde{K}(T(E)),$$
  where T(E) is the Thom space of the vector bundle E over X. This holds whenever E is a spin-bundle.
- The Atiyah-Hirzebruch spectral sequence allows computation of K-groups from ordinary cohomology groups.
- Topological K-theory can be generalized vastly to a functor on C*-algebras, see operator K-theory and KK-theory.

== Bott periodicity ==
The phenomenon of periodicity named after Raoul Bott (see Bott periodicity theorem) can be formulated this way:

- $K(X \times \mathbb{S}^2) = K(X) \otimes K(\mathbb{S}^2),$ and $K(\mathbb{S}^2) = \Z[H]/(H-1)^2$ where H is the class of the tautological bundle on $\mathbb{S}^2 = \mathbb{P}^1(\Complex),$ i.e. the Riemann sphere.
- $\widetilde{K}^{n+2}(X)=\widetilde{K}^n(X).$
- $\Omega^2 BU \cong BU \times \Z.$

In real K-theory there is a similar periodicity, but modulo 8.

== Applications ==
Topological K-theory has been applied in John Frank Adams’ proof of the “Hopf invariant one” problem via Adams operations. Adams also proved an upper bound for the number of linearly-independent vector fields on spheres.

== Chern character ==
Michael Atiyah and Friedrich Hirzebruch proved a theorem relating the topological K-theory of a finite CW complex $X$ with its rational cohomology. In particular, they showed that there exists a homomorphism

$$ch : K^*_{\text{top}}(X)\otimes\Q \to H^*(X;\Q)$$

such that

$$\begin{align}
K^0_{\text{top}}(X)\otimes \Q & \cong \bigoplus_k H^{2k}(X;\Q) \\
K^1_{\text{top}}(X)\otimes \Q & \cong \bigoplus_k H^{2k+1}(X;\Q)
\end{align}$$

There is an algebraic analogue relating the Grothendieck group of coherent sheaves and the Chow ring of a smooth projective variety $X$.

== See also ==
- Atiyah–Hirzebruch spectral sequence (computational tool for finding K-theory groups)
- KR-theory
- Atiyah–Singer index theorem
- Snaith's theorem
- Algebraic K-theory
