= Bass–Quillen conjecture =

Would relate vector bundles over a regular Noetherian ring and over a polynomial ring

In mathematics, the Bass–Quillen conjecture relates vector bundles over a regular Noetherian ring A and over the polynomial ring $A[t_1, \dots, t_n]$. The conjecture is named for Hyman Bass and Daniel Quillen, who formulated the conjecture.

== Statement of the conjecture ==
The conjecture is a statement about finitely generated projective modules. Such modules are also referred to as vector bundles. For a ring A, the set of isomorphism classes of vector bundles over A of rank r is denoted by $\operatorname{Vect}_r A$.

The conjecture asserts that for a regular Noetherian ring A the assignment

$$M \mapsto M \otimes_A A [t_1, \dots, t_n]$$

yields a bijection

$$\operatorname{Vect}_r A \,\stackrel \sim \to \operatorname{Vect}_r(A[t_1, \dots, t_n]).$$

== Known cases ==
If A = k is a field, the Bass–Quillen conjecture asserts that any projective module over $k[t_1, \dots, t_n]$ is free. This question was raised by Jean-Pierre Serre and was later proved by Quillen and Suslin; see Quillen–Suslin theorem. More generally, the conjecture was shown by Lindel (1981) in the case that A is a smooth algebra over a field k. Further known cases are reviewed in Lam (2006).

== Extensions ==
The set of isomorphism classes of vector bundles of rank r over A can also be identified with the nonabelian cohomology group

$$H^1_{Nis}(Spec (A), GL_r).$$

Positive results about the homotopy invariance of

$$H^1_{Nis}(U, G)$$

of isotropic reductive groups G have been obtained by Asok, Hoyois & Wendt (2018) by means of A^{1} homotopy theory.
