= Zeta function (operator) =

The zeta function of a mathematical operator $\mathcal O$ is a function defined as

$$\zeta_{\mathcal O}(s) = \operatorname{tr} \; \mathcal O^{-s}$$

for those values of s where this expression exists, and as an analytic continuation of this function for other values of s. Here "tr" denotes a functional trace.

The zeta function may also be expressible as a spectral zeta function in terms of the eigenvalues $\lambda_i$ of the operator $\mathcal O$ by

$$\zeta_{\mathcal O}(s) = \sum_{i} \lambda_i^{-s}$$.

It is used in giving a rigorous definition to the functional determinant of an operator, which is given by

$$\det \mathcal O := e^{-\zeta'_{\mathcal O}(0)} \;.$$

The Minakshisundaram–Pleijel zeta function is an example, when the operator is the Laplacian of a compact Riemannian manifold.

One of the most important motivations for Arakelov theory is the zeta functions for operators with the method of heat kernels generalized algebro-geometrically.

== See also ==
- Quillen metric
