= Quillen's lemma =

In algebra, Quillen's lemma states that an endomorphism of a simple module over the enveloping algebra of a finite-dimensional Lie algebra over a field k is algebraic over k. In contrast to a version of Schur's lemma due to Dixmier, it does not require k to be uncountable. Quillen's original short proof uses generic flatness.
