= Hyman Bass =

American mathematician

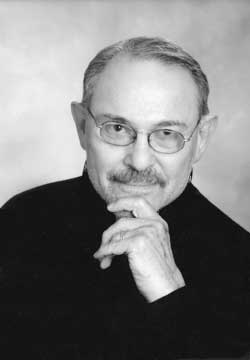
- Born: October 5, 1932 (age 93); Houston, Texas
- Education: University of Chicago (Ph.D.); Princeton University (B.A.)
- Known for: algebraic K-theory commutative algebra algebraic geometry algebraic groups Riemann zeta function
- Awards: National Medal of Science (2006); Cole Prize (1975)
- Scientific career
- Fields: Mathematics
- Workplaces: Columbia University; Barnard College; University of Michigan
- Thesis: Global dimensions of rings (1959)
- Doctoral advisor: Irving Kaplansky
- Doctoral students: Tsit Yuen Lam

Hyman Bass (/ˈhaɪmən bæs/; born October 5, 1932) is an American mathematician, known for work in algebra and in mathematics education. From 1959 to 1998 he was Professor in the Mathematics Department at Columbia University. He is currently the Samuel Eilenberg Distinguished University Professor of Mathematics and Professor of Mathematics Education at the University of Michigan.

== Life ==
Born to a Jewish family in Houston, Texas, he earned his B.A. in 1955 from Princeton University and his Ph.D. in 1959 from the University of Chicago. His thesis, titled Global dimensions of rings, was written under the supervision of Irving Kaplansky.

He has held visiting appointments at the Institute for Advanced Study in Princeton, New Jersey, Institut des Hautes Études Scientifiques and École Normale Supérieure (Paris), Tata Institute of Fundamental Research (Bombay), University of Cambridge, University of California, Berkeley, University of Rome, IMPA (Rio), National Autonomous University of Mexico, Mittag-Leffler Institute (Stockholm), and the University of Utah. He was president of the American Mathematical Society.

Bass formerly chaired the Mathematical Sciences Education Board (1992–2000) at the National Academy of Sciences, and the Committee on Education of the American Mathematical Society. He was the President of ICMI from 1999 to 2006. Since 1996 he has been collaborating with Deborah Ball and her research group at the University of Michigan on the mathematical knowledge and resources entailed in the teaching of mathematics at the elementary level. He has worked to build bridges between diverse professional communities and stakeholders involved in mathematics education.

== Work ==
His research interests have been in algebraic K-theory, commutative algebra and algebraic geometry, algebraic groups, geometric methods in group theory, and ζ functions on finite simple graphs.

== Awards and recognitions ==
Bass was elected as a member of the National Academy of Sciences in 1982. In 1983, he was elected a Fellow of the American Academy of Arts and Sciences. In 2002 he was elected a fellow of The World Academy of Sciences. He is a 2006 National Medal of Science laureate. In 2009 he was elected a member of the National Academy of Education. In 2012 he became a fellow of the American Mathematical Society. He was awarded the Mary P. Dolciani Award in 2013.

== See also ==
- Bass number
- Bass–Serre theory
- Bass–Quillen conjecture
