= Quillen determinant line bundle =

In mathematics, the Quillen determinant line bundle is a line bundle over the space of Cauchy–Riemann operators of a vector bundle over a Riemann surface, introduced by Quillen (1985). Quillen proved the existence of the Quillen metric on the determinant line bundle, a Hermitian metric defined using the analytic torsion of a family of differential operators.

== See also ==
- Quillen metric
