= Direct limit of groups =

Direct limit of a direct system of groups

In mathematics, a direct limit of groups is the direct limit of a direct system of groups. These are central objects of study in algebraic topology, especially stable homotopy theory and homological algebra. They are sometimes called finitary or stable groups, though this latter term normally means something quite different in model theory.

Certain examples of stable groups are easier to study than "unstable" groups, the groups occurring in the limit. This is a priori surprising, given that they are generally infinite-dimensional, constructed as limits of groups with finite-dimensional representations.

The notion of a direct limit captures many vague but intuitive ideas of "group limits": the finite Symmetric groups $S_n$ should limit to an infinite symmetric group and the subgroups of a group $G$ should limit to $G$, in some sense. Under the direct limit construction, group families (symmetric groups, dihedral groups, general linear groups, etc) will generally limit to the finitary or stable subgroup of the corresponding infinite group: the groups $S_n$ don't limit to the permutation group of a countable set, $S_\omega$, but do limit to its subgroup of permutations which permute only finitely many objects. We'll also often see that recovering a group as a direct limit of its subgroups can be done simply (and sometimes only) with its finitely generated subgroups. Direct limits have a more general definition in Category theory, which reduces to the definition below in the category of groups, and more generally, any concrete category.

== Definition ==
Let $I$ be a set with a transitive, reflexive binary relation $\preceq$ (a preorder). We call $I$ a directed set if, for all $i$ and $j$ in $I$, there exists some $k\in I$ such that $i\preceq k$ and $j\preceq k$. Let $\{G_i\}$ be a family of groups indexed by $I$ with group homomorphisms $f_{i,j}:G_i\to G_j$ for all $i\preceq j$ in $I$ such that

1. $f_{i,i}=\operatorname{id}_{G_i}$ for all $i$ in $I$
2. $f_{j,k}\circ f_{i,j}=f_{i,k}$ for all $i\preceq j\preceq k$ in $I$.

The pair $\langle G_i,f_{i,j}\rangle$ is called a direct system, and we form the set. The direct limit of the direct system $\langle G_i,f_{ij}\rangle$ is denoted by $\varinjlim G_i$ and is defined on equivalence classes of the disjoint union of the $G_i$ with $x_i\sim x_j$ for $x_i\in G_i$ and $x_j\in G_j$ if there is an upper bound $k$ of $i$ and $j$ such that $f_{i,k}(x_i)=f_{j,k}(x_j)$. That is,

  
    
      
        
          
            lim
            →
          
        
        ⁡
        
          G
          
            i
          
        
        
           has underlying set 
        
        
          ⨆
          
            i
            ∈
            I
          
        
        
          G
          
            i
          
        
        
          
            /
          
        
        ∼
        .
      
    
    {\displaystyle \varinjlim G_{i}{\text{ has underlying set }}\bigsqcup _{i\in I}G_{i}{\bigg /}\sim .}
  

For $x_i\in G_i$, $x_j\in G_j$, and upper bound $k$ of $i$ and $j$, we define the binary operation on $\varinjlim G_i$ by setting $[x_i]\cdot[x_j]=[f_{i,k}(x_i)f_{j,k}(x_j)]$, where the multiplication $f_{i,k}(x_i)f_{j,k}(x_j)$ is performed in $G_k$. The operation is well defined by the compatibility condition on the $f_{i,j}$, and associativity follows from associativity in the $G_i$. Since each map $f_{i,j}$ is a homomorphism, all identities lie in the same equivalence class, and this class forms the identity of $\varinjlim G_i$. Finally, the inverse of $[x_i]$ for $x_i\in G_i$ is simply $[x_i^{-1}]$.

Like many categorical constructions, direct limits are unique in a strong sense: for two direct limits $A$ and $B$ of a direct system, there exists a unique isomorphism $A\cong B$.

== Examples ==
- The set of $\mathbb{Z}$ under its usual order forms a directed set which indexes the family of finite symmetric groups $S_n$. With the usual embeddings $f_{i,j}:S_i\to S_j$, these groups and maps form a direct system with direct limit (isomorphic to) the subgroup of the symmetric group on countably many things $S_\omega$ which contains permutations permutating only finitely many objects. If the integers $\mathbb{Z}$ are viewed under the alternate partial order of divisibility, and only the approriate embeddings $f_{i,j}:S_i\to S_j$ are kept, the same direct limit is formed.
- For a prime number $p$, we form the direct system of factor groups $\mathbb{Z}/p^n\mathbb{Z}$ with multiplication by $p$homomorphisms $f_{i,i+1}:\mathbb{Z}/p^i\mathbb{Z} \rightarrow \mathbb{Z}/p^{i+1}\mathbb{Z}$. Setting
  $$f_{i,i+j}=f_{i+j-1,i+j}\circ\dots f_{i+1,i+2}\circ f_{i,i+1}$$
  forms a direct system with direct limit called the Prüfer group $\mathbb{Z}(p^\infty)$. One exists for each prime $p$ and consists of all $p^{\text{th}}$ roots of unity of all powers of $p$. This demonstrates that for totally ordered index sets, only the maps $f_{i,i+1}$ need to be specified.
- Each family of classical groups forms a direct system, via inclusion of matrices in the upper left corner, such as $\operatorname{GL}(n,A) \to \operatorname{GL}(n+1,A)$with a $1$ on the remaining diagonal entry and zeros everywhere else. The stable groups are denoted $\operatorname{GL}(A)$ or $\operatorname{GL}(\infty,A)$. Bott periodicity computes the homotopy of the stable unitary group and stable orthogonal group. The Whitehead group of a ring (the first K-group) can be defined in terms of $\operatorname{GL}(A)$. Stable homotopy groups of spheres are the stable groups associated with the suspension functor.

== Properties ==
- If $\langle G_i,f_{i,j}\rangle$ is a direct system with index set $I$ containing maximum element $n$, then $\varinjlim G_i$ is (isomorphic to) $G_n$. Similarly, if there exists some $i\in I$ such that for all $j,k\geq i$, $G_j=G_k$, then $\varinjlim G_n$ is (isomorphic to) $G_i$.
- The collection of finitely generated subgroups $H_i$ of a given group $G$ can be partially ordered by inclusion. Finite sets of finitely generated subgroups $\{\langle X_1\rangle, \langle X_2\rangle,\dots \langle X_n\rangle\}$ are contained in the finitely generated subgroup $\langle\cup X_i\rangle$, so the index set is indeed directed. With the inclusion morphisms $f_{i,j}:H_i\to H_j$, the direct limit is simply (isomorphic to) $G$. An analogous result holds for rings, modules, algebras, etc. Note the requirement of finite generation may be weakened, as long as the index set remains directed. Often times, this is only possible if the entire group is included in the collection of subgroups.
- Say$\langle G_i,f_{i,j}\rangle$ is a direct system with index set $(I,\preceq)$, and a $\leq$ is an sub preorder on $I$ such that $(I,\leq)$ is a directed set and upper bounds under $\leq$ are upper bounds under $\preceq$. Then the directed systems $\langle G_i,f_{i,j}\rangle_{(I,\preceq)}$ and $\langle G_i,f_{i,j}\rangle_{(I,\leq)}$ are isomorphic

== See also ==
- Inverse limit – Construction in category theory
