= Grothendieck group =

Abelian group extending a commutative monoid

In mathematics, the Grothendieck group, or group of differences, of a commutative monoid M is a certain abelian group. This abelian group is constructed from M in the most universal way, in the sense that any abelian group containing a homomorphic image of M will also contain a homomorphic image of the Grothendieck group of M. The Grothendieck group construction takes its name from a specific case in category theory, introduced by Alexander Grothendieck in his proof of the Grothendieck–Riemann–Roch theorem, which resulted in the development of K-theory. This specific case is the monoid of isomorphism classes of objects of an abelian category, with the direct sum as its operation.

== Grothendieck group of a commutative monoid ==
=== Motivation ===
Given a commutative monoid $M$, "the most general" abelian group $K$ that arises from $M$ is to be constructed by introducing inverse elements to all elements of $M$. Such an abelian group $K$ always exists; it is called the Grothendieck group of $M$. It is characterized by a certain universal property and can also be concretely constructed from $M$.

If $M$ does not have the cancellation property (that is, there exists $a,b$ and $c$ in $M$ such that $a\ne b$ and $ac=bc$), then the Grothendieck group $K$ cannot contain $M$. In particular, in the case of a monoid operation denoted multiplicatively that has a zero element satisfying $0\cdot x=0$ for every $x\in M,$ the Grothendieck group must be the trivial group (group with only one element), since one must have

$$x=1\cdot x=(0^{-1}\cdot 0)\cdot x = 0^{-1}\cdot(0\cdot x)=0^{-1}\cdot 0=0$$

for every $x$.

=== Universal property ===
Let M be a commutative monoid. Its Grothendieck group is an abelian group K with a monoid homomorphism $i \colon M \to K$ satisfying the following universal property: for any monoid homomorphism $f \colon M \to A$ from M to an abelian group A, there is a unique group homomorphism $g \colon K \to A$ such that $f = g \circ i.$

This expresses the fact that any abelian group A that contains a homomorphic image of M will also contain a homomorphic image of K, K being the "most general" abelian group containing a homomorphic image of M.

=== Explicit constructions ===
To construct the Grothendieck group K of a commutative monoid M, one forms the Cartesian product $M \times M$. The two coordinates are meant to represent a positive part and a negative part, so $(m_1, m_2)$ corresponds to $m_1- m_2$ in K.

Addition on $M\times M$ is defined coordinate-wise:

$$(m_1, m_2) + (n_1,n_2) = (m_1+n_1, m_2+n_2)$$.

Next one defines an equivalence relation on $M \times M$, such that $(m_1, m_2)$ is equivalent to $(n_1, n_2)$ if, for some element k of M, m_{1} + n_{2} + k = m_{2} + n_{1} + k (the element k is necessary because the cancellation law does not hold in all monoids). The equivalence class of the element (m_{1}, m_{2}) is denoted by [(m_{1}, m_{2})]. One defines K to be the set of equivalence classes. Since the addition operation on M × M is compatible with our equivalence relation, one obtains an addition on K, and K becomes an abelian group. The identity element of K is [(0, 0)], and the inverse of [(m_{1}, m_{2})] is [(m_{2}, m_{1})]. The homomorphism $i:M\to K$ sends the element m to [(m, 0)].

Alternatively, the Grothendieck group K of M can also be constructed using generators and relations: denoting by $(Z(M), +')$ the free abelian group generated by the set M, the Grothendieck group K is the quotient of $Z(M)$ by the subgroup generated by $\{(x+'y)-'(x+y)\mid x,y\in M\}$. (Here +′ and −′ denote the addition and subtraction in the free abelian group $Z(M)$ while + denotes the addition in the monoid M.) This construction has the advantage that it can be performed for any semigroup M and yields a group which satisfies the corresponding universal properties for semigroups, i.e. the "most general and smallest group containing a homomorphic image of M". This is known as the "group completion of a semigroup" or "group of fractions of a semigroup".

=== Properties ===
In the language of category theory, any universal construction gives rise to a functor; one thus obtains a functor from the category of commutative monoids to the category of abelian groups which sends the commutative monoid M to its Grothendieck group K. This functor is left adjoint to the forgetful functor from the category of abelian groups to the category of commutative monoids.

For a commutative monoid M, the map i : M → K is injective if and only if M has the cancellation property, and it is bijective if and only if M is already a group.

=== Example: the integers ===
The easiest example of a Grothendieck group is the construction of the integers $\Z$ from the (additive) natural numbers $\N$. First one observes that the natural numbers (including 0) together with the usual addition indeed form a commutative monoid $(\N, +).$ Now when one uses the Grothendieck group construction one obtains the formal differences between natural numbers as elements n − m and one has the equivalence relation

$n - m \sim n' - m' \iff n + m' + k = n'+ m + k$ for some $k \iff n + m' = n' + m$.

Now define

$$\forall n \in \N: \qquad \begin{cases} n := [n - 0] \\ -n := [0 - n] \end{cases}$$

This defines the integers $\Z$. Indeed, this is the usual construction to obtain the integers from the natural numbers. See "Construction" under Integers for a more detailed explanation.

=== Example: the positive rational numbers ===
Similarly, the Grothendieck group of the multiplicative commutative monoid $(\N^*, \times)$ (starting at 1) consists of formal fractions $p/q$ with the equivalence

$p/q \sim p'/q' \iff pq'r = p'qr$ for some $r \iff pq' = p'q$

which of course can be identified with the positive rational numbers.

=== Example: the Grothendieck group of a manifold ===
The Grothendieck group is the fundamental construction of K-theory. The group $K_0(M)$ of a compact manifold M is defined to be the Grothendieck group of the commutative monoid of all isomorphism classes of vector bundles of finite rank on M with the monoid operation given by direct sum. This gives a contravariant functor from manifolds to abelian groups. This functor is studied and extended in topological K-theory.

=== Example: The Grothendieck group of a ring ===
The zeroth algebraic K group $K_0(R)$ of a (not necessarily commutative) ring R is the Grothendieck group of the monoid consisting of isomorphism classes of finitely generated projective modules over R, with the monoid operation given by the direct sum. Then $K_0$ is a covariant functor from rings to abelian groups.

The two previous examples are related: consider the case where $R = C^\infty(M)$ is the ring of complex-valued smooth functions on a compact manifold M. In this case the projective R-modules are dual to vector bundles over M (by the Serre–Swan theorem). Thus $K_0(R)$ and $K_0(M)$ are the same group.

== Grothendieck group and extensions ==
=== Definition ===
Another construction that carries the name Grothendieck group is the following: Let R be a finite-dimensional algebra over some field k or more generally an artinian ring. Then define the Grothendieck group $G_0(R)$ as the abelian group generated by the set $\{[X] \mid X \in R\text{-mod}\}$ of isomorphism classes of finitely generated R-modules and the following relations: For every short exact sequence

$$0 \to A \to B \to C \to 0$$

of R-modules, add the relation

$$[A] - [B] + [C] = 0.$$

This definition implies that for any two finitely generated R-modules M and N, $[M \oplus N] = [M] + [N]$, because of the split short exact sequence

$$0 \to M \to M \oplus N \to N \to 0.$$

=== Examples ===
Let K be a field. Then the Grothendieck group $G_0(K)$ is an abelian group generated by symbols $[V]$ for any finite-dimensional K-vector space V. In fact, $G_0(K)$ is isomorphic to $\Z$ whose generator is the element $[K]$. Here, the symbol $[V]$ for a finite-dimensional K-vector space V is defined as $[V] = \dim_K V$, the dimension of the vector space V. Suppose one has the following short exact sequence of K-vector spaces.

$$0 \to V \to T \to W \to 0$$

Since any short exact sequence of vector spaces splits, it holds that $T \cong V \oplus W$. In fact, for any two finite-dimensional vector spaces V and W the following holds:

$$\dim_K(V \oplus W) = \dim_K(V) + \dim_K(W)$$

The above equality hence satisfies the condition of the symbol $[V]$ in the Grothendieck group.

$$[T] = [V \oplus W] = [V] + [W]$$

Note that any two isomorphic finite-dimensional K-vector spaces have the same dimension. Also, any two finite-dimensional K-vector spaces V and W of same dimension are isomorphic to each other. In fact, every finite n-dimensional K-vector space V is isomorphic to $K^{\oplus n}$. The observation from the previous paragraph hence proves the following equation:

$$[V] = \left[ K^{\oplus n} \right] = n[K]$$

Hence, every symbol $[V]$ is generated by the element $[K]$ with integer coefficients, which implies that $G_0(K)$ is isomorphic to $\Z$ with the generator $[K]$.

More generally, let $\Z$ be the set of integers. The Grothendieck group $G_0(\Z)$ is an abelian group generated by symbols $[A]$ for any finitely generated abelian groups A. One first notes that any finite abelian group G satisfies that $[G] = 0$. The following short exact sequence holds, where the map $\Z \to \Z$ is multiplication by n.

$$0 \to \Z \to \Z \to \Z /n\Z \to 0$$

The exact sequence implies that $[\Z /n\Z] = [\Z] - [\Z] = 0$, so every cyclic group has its symbol equal to 0. This in turn implies that every finite abelian group G satisfies $[G] = 0$ by the fundamental theorem of finite abelian groups.

Observe that by the fundamental theorem of finitely generated abelian groups, every abelian group A is isomorphic to a direct sum of a torsion subgroup and a torsion-free abelian group isomorphic to $\Z^r$ for some non-negative integer r, called the rank of A and denoted by $r = \mbox{rank}(A)$ . Define the symbol $[A]$ as $[A] = \mbox{rank}(A)$. Then the Grothendieck group $G_0(\Z)$ is isomorphic to $\Z$ with generator $[\Z].$ Indeed, the observation made from the previous paragraph shows that every abelian group A has its symbol $[A]$ the same to the symbol $[\Z^r] = r[\Z]$ where $r = \mbox{rank}(A)$. Furthermore, the rank of the abelian group satisfies the conditions of the symbol $[A]$ of the Grothendieck group. Suppose one has the following short exact sequence of abelian groups:

$$0 \to A \to B \to C \to 0$$

Then tensoring with the rational numbers $\Q$ implies the following equation.

$$0 \to A \otimes_\Z \Q \to B \otimes_\Z \Q \to C \otimes_\Z \Q \to 0$$

Since the above is a short exact sequence of $\Q$-vector spaces, the sequence splits. Therefore, one has the following equation.

$$\dim_\Q (B \otimes_\Z \Q ) = \dim_\Q (A \otimes_\Z \Q) + \dim_\Q (C \otimes_\Z \Q )$$

On the other hand, one also has the following relation; for more information, see Rank of an abelian group.

$$\operatorname{rank}(A) = \dim_\Q (A \otimes_\Z \Q )$$

Therefore, the following equation holds:

$$[B] = \operatorname{rank}(B) = \operatorname{rank}(A) + \operatorname{rank}(C) = [A] + [C]$$

Hence one has shown that $G_0(\Z)$ is isomorphic to $\Z$ with generator $[\Z].$

=== Universal Property ===
The Grothendieck group satisfies a universal property. One makes a preliminary definition: A function $\chi$ from the set of isomorphism classes to an abelian group $X$ is called additive if, for each exact sequence $0 \to A \to B \to C \to 0$, one has $\chi(A)-\chi(B)+\chi(C)= 0.$ Then, for any additive function $\chi: R\text{-mod} \to X$, there is a unique group homomorphism $f:G_0(R) \to X$ such that $\chi$ factors through $f$ and the map that takes each object of $\mathcal A$ to the element representing its isomorphism class in $G_0(R).$ Concretely this means that $f$ satisfies the equation $f([V])=\chi(V)$ for every finitely generated $R$-module $V$ and $f$ is the only group homomorphism that does that.

Examples of additive functions are the character function from representation theory: If $R$ is a finite-dimensional $k$-algebra, then one can associate the character $\chi_V: R \to k$ to every finite-dimensional $R$-module $V: \chi_V(x)$ is defined to be the trace of the $k$-linear map that is given by multiplication with the element $x \in R$ on $V$.

By choosing a suitable basis and writing the corresponding matrices in block triangular form one easily sees that character functions are additive in the above sense. By the universal property this gives us a "universal character" $\chi: G_0(R)\to \mathrm{Hom}_K(R,K)$ such that $\chi([V]) = \chi_V$.

If $k=\Complex$ and $R$ is the group ring $\Complex[G]$ of a finite group $G$ then this character map even gives a natural isomorphism of $G_0(\Complex[G])$ and the character ring $Ch(G)$. In the modular representation theory of finite groups, $k$ can be a field $\overline{\mathbb{F}_p},$ the algebraic closure of the finite field with p elements. In this case the analogously defined map that associates to each $k[G]$-module its Brauer character is also a natural isomorphism $G_0(\overline{\mathbb{F}_p}[G])\to \mathrm{BCh}(G)$ onto the ring of Brauer characters. In this way Grothendieck groups show up in representation theory.

This universal property also makes $G_0(R)$ the 'universal receiver' of generalized Euler characteristics. In particular, for every bounded complex of objects in $R\text{-mod}$

$$\cdots \to 0 \to 0 \to A^n \to A^{n+1} \to \cdots \to A^{m-1} \to A^m \to 0 \to 0 \to \cdots$$

one has a canonical element

$$[A^*] = \sum_i (-1)^i [A^i] = \sum_i (-1)^i [H^i (A^*)] \in G_0(R).$$

In fact the Grothendieck group was originally introduced for the study of Euler characteristics.

== Grothendieck groups of exact categories ==
A common generalization of these two concepts is given by the Grothendieck group of an exact category $\mathcal{A}$. Simply put, an exact category is an additive category together with a class of distinguished short sequences A → B → C. The distinguished sequences are called "exact sequences", hence the name. The precise axioms for this distinguished class do not matter for the construction of the Grothendieck group.

The Grothendieck group is defined in the same way as before as the abelian group with one generator [M ] for each (isomorphism class of) object(s) of the category $\mathcal{A}$ and one relation

$$[A]-[B]+[C] = 0$$

for each exact sequence

$$0\to A\to B\to C\to 0$$.

Alternatively and equivalently, one can define the Grothendieck group using a universal property: A map $\chi: \mathrm{Ob}(\mathcal{A})\to X$ from $\mathcal{A}$ into an abelian group X is called "additive" if for every exact sequence $0\to A\to B\to C\to 0$ one has $\chi(A)-\chi(B)+\chi(C)=0$; an abelian group G together with an additive mapping $\phi: \mathrm{Ob}(\mathcal{A})\to G$ is called the Grothendieck group of $\mathcal{A}$ iff every additive map $\chi: \mathrm{Ob}(\mathcal{A})\to X$ factors uniquely through $\phi$.

Every abelian category is an exact category if one just uses the standard interpretation of "exact". This gives the notion of a Grothendieck group in the previous section if one chooses $\mathcal{A} := R\text{-mod}$ the category of finitely generated R-modules as $\mathcal{A}$. This is really abelian because R was assumed to be artinian (and hence noetherian) in the previous section.

On the other hand, every additive category is also exact if one declares those and only those sequences to be exact that have the form $0\to A\to A\oplus B\to B\to 0$ with the canonical inclusion and projection morphisms. This procedure produces the Grothendieck group of the commutative monoid $(\mathrm{Iso}(\mathcal{A}),\oplus)$ in the first sense (here $\mathrm{Iso}(\mathcal{A})$ means the "set" [ignoring all foundational issues] of isomorphism classes in $\mathcal{A}$.)

== Grothendieck groups of triangulated categories ==
Generalizing even further it is also possible to define the Grothendieck group for triangulated categories. The construction is essentially similar but uses the relations [X] − [Y] + [Z] = 0 whenever there is a distinguished triangle X → Y → Z → X[1].

== Further examples ==
- In the abelian category of finite-dimensional vector spaces over a field k, two vector spaces are isomorphic if and only if they have the same dimension. Thus, for a vector space V

$$[V] = \big[ k^{\dim(V)} \big] \in K_0 (\mathrm{Vect}_{\mathrm{fin}}).$$

Moreover, for an exact sequence

$$0 \to k^l \to k^m \to k^n \to 0$$

m = l + n, so

$$\left[ k^{l+n} \right] = \left[ k^l \right] + \left[ k^n \right] = (l+n)[k].$$

Thus

$$[V] = \dim(V)[k],$$

and $K_0(\mathrm{Vect}_{\mathrm{fin}})$ is isomorphic to $\Z$ and is generated by $[k].$ Finally for a bounded complex of finite-dimensional vector spaces V *,

$$[V^*] = \chi(V^*)[k]$$

where $\chi$ is the standard Euler characteristic defined by

$$\chi(V^*)= \sum_i (-1)^i \dim V = \sum_i (-1)^i \dim H^i(V^*).$$

- For a ringed space $(X,\mathcal{O}_X)$, one can consider the category $\mathcal{A}$ of all locally free sheaves over X. $K_0(X)$ is then defined as the Grothendieck group of this exact category and again this gives a functor.
- For a ringed space $(X,\mathcal{O}_X)$, one can also define the category $\mathcal A$ to be the category of all coherent sheaves on X. This includes the special case (if the ringed space is an affine scheme) of $\mathcal{A}$ being the category of finitely generated modules over a noetherian ring R. In both cases $\mathcal{A}$ is an abelian category and a fortiori an exact category so the construction above applies.
- In the case where R is a finite-dimensional algebra over some field, the Grothendieck groups $G_0(R)$ (defined via short exact sequences of finitely generated modules) and $K_0(R)$ (defined via direct sum of finitely generated projective modules) coincide. In fact, both groups are isomorphic to the free abelian group generated by the isomorphism classes of simple R-modules.
- There is another Grothendieck group $G_0$ of a ring or a ringed space which is sometimes useful. The category in the case is chosen to be the category of all quasi-coherent sheaves on the ringed space which reduces to the category of all modules over some ring R in case of affine schemes. $G_0$ is not a functor, but nevertheless it carries important information.
- Since the (bounded) derived category is triangulated, there is a Grothendieck group for derived categories too. This has applications in representation theory for example. For the unbounded category the Grothendieck group however vanishes. For a derived category of some complex finite-dimensional positively graded algebra there is a subcategory in the unbounded derived category containing the abelian category A of finite-dimensional graded modules whose Grothendieck group is the q-adic completion of the Grothendieck group of A.

== See also ==
- Field of fractions
- Localization
- Topological K-theory
- Atiyah–Hirzebruch spectral sequence for computing topological K-theory
