= Otto Forster =

German mathematician (born 1937)

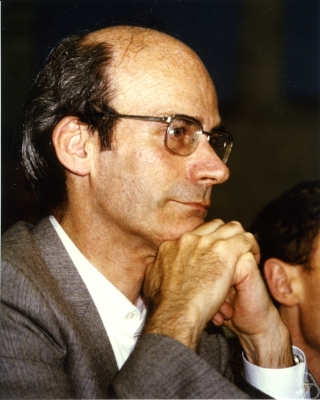
Otto Forster in Mathematisches Forschungsinstitut Oberwolfach 1987

Otto Forster (born 8 July 1937 in Munich) is a German mathematician.

== Education and career ==
Forster received his Diplom in 1960 from Ludwig-Maximilians-Universität München (LMU). There he received his doctorate in 1961. His thesis Banachalgebren stetiger Funktionen auf kompakten Räumen (Banach algebras of continuous functions on compact spaces) was supervised by Karl Stein. In 1965 Forster also completed his habilitation in Munich. After spending the academic year 1966–1967 at the Institute for Advanced Study and the academic year 1967–1968 as a substitute professor at the University of Göttingen, he became a full professor at the University of Regensburg in 1968. In 1968–1969 he was a visiting professor at the University of Geneva. In 1975, he moved to the University of Münster. Since 1982 he has been a professor at the Mathematical Institute of the Ludwig-Maximilians-Universität München. Even after his retirement in summer 2005, he still regularly offers lectures for advanced students.

In 1970, he was an invited speaker with talk Topologische Methoden in der Theorie Steinscher Räume (Topological methods in the theory of Stein spaces) at the International Congress of Mathematicians in Nice. In 1984 he became a member of the Bavarian Academy of Sciences and Humanities.

Forster's research deals mainly with complex analysis, but also with questions of algebraic geometry, analytic number theory, and algorithmic number theory. His program ARIBAS, an interpreter with a Pascal-like syntax, offers powerful arbitrary-precision arithmetic and various library functions based on such computational arithmetic. ARIBAS, available under the GNU General Public License, also serves as the basis for the algorithms discussed in Forster's book Algorithmische Zahlentheorie (Algorithmic number theory). He wrote two appendices for the 2nd edition of Dale Husemöller's book Elliptic Curves.

He discovered the Forster–Swan theorem.

== Selected publications ==
=== Articles ===
- Forster, Otto (1967). "Zur Theorie der Steinschen Algebren und Moduln". Mathematische Zeitschrift. 97 (5): 376–405. doi:10.1007/BF01112815. S2CID 121327739.
- Forster, Otto (1967). "Some remarks on parallelizable Stein manifolds". Bulletin of the American Mathematical Society. 73 (5): 712–717. doi:10.1090/S0002-9904-1967-11839-1.
- Forster, Otto (1970). "Plongements des variétés de stein". Commentarii Mathematici Helvetici. 45: 170–184. doi:10.1007/BF02567324. S2CID 124446287.
- Forster, O. (1974). "Funktionetheoretische Hilfsmittel in der Theorie der kommutativen Banach-Algebren". Jahresbericht der Deutschen Mathematiker-Vereinigung. 76: 1–17.
- Bănică, C.; Forster, O. (1982). "Complete intersections in Stein manifolds". Manuscripta Mathematica. 37 (3): 343–356. doi:10.1007/BF01166226. S2CID 121260434.
- Elencwajg, Georges; Forster, O. (1982). "Vector bundles on manifolds without divisors and a theorem on deformations" (PDF). Annales de l'Institut Fourier. 32 (4): 25–51. doi:10.5802/aif.893.
- Forster, Otto (1984). "Complete intersections in affine algebraic varieties and Stein spaces". Complete Intersections. Lecture Notes in Mathematics. Vol. 1092. pp. 1–28. doi:10.1007/BFb0099355. ISBN 978-3-540-13884-6.
- Bǎnicǎ, C.; Forster, O. (1986). "Multiplicity structures on space curves" (PDF). Contemp. Math. 58: 47–64.
- Forster, Otto; Ohsawa, Takeo (1987). "Complete Intersections with Growth Conditions". Algebraic Geometry, Sendai, 1985. pp. 91–104. doi:10.2969/aspm/01010091. ISBN 978-4-86497-068-6. S2CID 133482242.
- Forster, O. (15 June 2011). "The theorem of Gauß-Bonnet in complex analysis". In Behara, Minaketan; Fritsch, Rudolf; Lintz, Rubens G. (eds.). Mathematics and Theoretical Physics. Walter de Gruyter. pp. 451–458. ISBN 978-3-11-088672-6.

=== Books ===
- with Knut Knorr: Konstruktion verseller Familien kompakter komplexer Räume. Vol. 705. Springer-Verlag. 2006. ISBN 9783540355076.
- Analysis 1. Differential- und Integralrechnung einer Veränderlichen. 12th edition. Springer, 2016, ISBN 978-3-658-11545-6.
- Analysis 2. Differentialrechnung im R^{n}. Gewöhnliche Differentialgleichungen. 11th edition. Springer, 2017, ISBN 978-3-658-19411-6.
- Analysis 3. Maß- und Integrationstheorie, Integralsätze im R^{n} und Anwendungen. 8th edition. Springer, 2017, ISBN 978-3-658-16746-2.
- Algorithmische Zahlentheorie, 2nd edition. Springer, 2015, ISBN 978-3-658-06539-3.
- Riemannsche Flächen. Springer, 1977; English translation: Lectures on Riemann surfaces. Graduate Texts in Mathematics. Springer, 1991, ISBN 3-540-90617-7; 2012 reprint
