= Quillen–Suslin theorem =

Commutative algebra theorem

- Field: Commutative algebra
- Conjectured by: Jean-Pierre Serre
- Conjectured in: 1955
- First proof by: Daniel Quillen; Andrei Suslin
- First proof in: 1976

The Quillen–Suslin theorem, also known as Serre's problem or Serre's conjecture, is a theorem in commutative algebra concerning the relationship between free modules and projective modules over polynomial rings. In the geometric setting it is a statement about the triviality of vector bundles on affine space.

The theorem states that every finitely generated projective module over a polynomial ring is free.

== History ==
=== Background ===
Geometrically, finitely generated projective modules over the ring $R[x_1,\dots,x_n]$ correspond to vector bundles over affine space $\mathbb{A}^n_R$, where free modules correspond to trivial vector bundles. This correspondence (from modules to (algebraic) vector bundles) is given by the 'globalisation' or 'twiddlification' functor, sending $M$ to $\widetilde{M}$. Affine space is topologically contractible, so it admits no non-trivial topological or smooth vector bundles. The Oka-Grauert principle gives a bijection between isomorphism classes of topological and holomorphic vector bundles on affine space, so there are no non-trivial holomorphic vector bundles either.

Jean-Pierre Serre, in his 1955 paper Faisceaux algébriques cohérents, remarked that the corresponding question was not known for algebraic vector bundles: "It is not known whether there exist projective A-modules of finite type which are not free." Here $A$ is a polynomial ring over a field, that is, $A=k[x_1,\dots,x_n]$.

To Serre's dismay, this problem quickly became known as Serre's conjecture. (Serre wrote, "I objected as often as I could [to the name].") The statement does not immediately follow from the proofs given in the topological or holomorphic case. These cases only guarantee that there is a continuous or holomorphic trivialization, not an algebraic trivialization.

Serre made some progress towards a solution in 1957 when he proved that every finitely generated projective module over a polynomial ring over a field was stably free, meaning that after forming its direct sum with a finitely generated free module, it became free. The problem remained open until 1976, when Daniel Quillen and Andrei Suslin independently proved the result. Quillen was awarded the Fields Medal in 1978 in part for his proof of the Serre conjecture. Leonid Vaseršteĭn later gave a simpler and much shorter proof of the theorem, which can be found in Serge Lang's Algebra.

== Generalization ==
A generalization relating projective modules over regular Noetherian rings A and their polynomial rings is known as the Bass–Quillen conjecture.

Note that although $GL_n$-bundles on affine space are all trivial, this is not true for G-bundles where G is a general reductive algebraic group.
