= Atiyah–Hirzebruch spectral sequence =

In mathematics, the Atiyah–Hirzebruch spectral sequence is a spectral sequence for calculating generalized cohomology, introduced by Michael Atiyah and Friedrich Hirzebruch (1961) in the special case of topological K-theory. For a CW complex $X$ and a generalized cohomology theory $E^\bullet$, it relates the generalized cohomology groups

$$E^i(X)$$

with 'ordinary' cohomology groups $H^j$ with coefficients in the generalized cohomology of a point. More precisely, the $E_2$ term of the spectral sequence is $H^p(X;E^q(pt))$, and the spectral sequence converges conditionally to $E^{p+q}(X)$.

Atiyah and Hirzebruch pointed out a generalization of their spectral sequence that also generalizes the Serre spectral sequence, and reduces to it in the case where $E=H_{\text{Sing}}$. It can be derived from an exact couple that gives the $E_1$ page of the Serre spectral sequence, except with the ordinary cohomology groups replaced with $E$. In detail, assume $X$ to be the total space of a Serre fibration with fibre $F$ and base space $B$. The filtration of $B$ by its $n$-skeletons $B_n$ gives rise to a filtration of $X$. There is a corresponding spectral sequence with $E_2$ term

$$H^p(B; E^q(F))$$

and converging to the associated graded ring of the filtered ring

$$E_\infty^{p,q} \Rightarrow E^{p+q}(X)$$.

This is the Atiyah–Hirzebruch spectral sequence in the case where the fibre $F$ is a point.

== Examples ==
=== Topological K-theory ===
For example, the complex topological $K$-theory of a point is

$KU(*) = \mathbb{Z}[x,x^{-1}]$ where $x$ is in degree $2$

By definition, the terms on the $E_2$-page of a finite CW-complex $X$ look like

$$E_2^{p,q}(X) = H^p(X;KU^q(pt))$$

Since the $K$-theory of a point is

$$K^q(pt) = \begin{cases}
\mathbb{Z} & \text{if q is even} \\
0 & \text{otherwise}
\end{cases}$$

we can always guarantee that

$$E_2^{p,2k+1}(X) = 0$$

This implies that the spectral sequence collapses on $E_2$ for many spaces. This can be checked on every $\mathbb{CP}^n$, algebraic curves, or spaces with non-zero cohomology in even degrees. Therefore, it collapses for all (complex) even dimensional smooth complete intersections in $\mathbb{CP}^n$.

==== Cotangent bundle on a circle ====
For example, consider the cotangent bundle of $S^1$. This is a fiber bundle with fiber $\mathbb{R}$ so the $E_2$-page reads as

$$\begin{array}{c|cc}
\vdots &\vdots & \vdots \\
2 & H^0(S^1;\mathbb{Q}) & H^1(S^1;\mathbb{Q}) \\
1 & 0 & 0 \\
0 & H^0(S^1;\mathbb{Q}) & H^1(S^1;\mathbb{Q}) \\
-1 & 0 & 0 \\
-2 & H^0(S^1;\mathbb{Q}) & H^1(S^1;\mathbb{Q}) \\
\vdots &\vdots & \vdots \\
\hline & 0 & 1
\end{array}$$

==== Differentials ====
The odd-dimensional differentials of the AHSS for complex topological K-theory can be readily computed. For $d_3$ it is the Steenrod square $Sq^3$ where we take it as the composition

$$\beta \circ Sq^2 \circ r$$

where $r$ is reduction mod $2$ and $\beta$ is the Bockstein homomorphism (connecting morphism) from the short exact sequence

$0 \to \mathbb{Z} \to \mathbb{Z} \to \mathbb{Z}/2 \to 0$

==== Complete intersection 3-fold ====
Consider a smooth complete intersection 3-fold $X$ (such as a complete intersection Calabi-Yau 3-fold). If we look at the $E_2$-page of the spectral sequence

$$\begin{array}{c|ccccc}
\vdots & \vdots & \vdots & \vdots & \vdots & \vdots & \vdots & \vdots \\
2 & H^0(X; \mathbb{Z}) & 0 & H^2(X;\mathbb{Z}) & H^3(X;\mathbb{Z}) & H^4(X;\mathbb{Z}) & 0 & H^6(X;\mathbb{Z})  \\
1 & 0 & 0 & 0 & 0 & 0 & 0 & 0 \\
0 & H^0(X; \mathbb{Z}) & 0 & H^2(X;\mathbb{Z}) & H^3(X;\mathbb{Z}) & H^4(X;\mathbb{Z}) & 0 & H^6(X;\mathbb{Z})\\
-1 & 0 & 0 & 0 & 0 & 0 & 0 & 0 \\
-2 & H^0(X; \mathbb{Z}) & 0 & H^2(X;\mathbb{Z}) & H^3(X;\mathbb{Z}) & H^4(X;\mathbb{Z}) & 0 & H^6(X;\mathbb{Z})\\
\vdots & \vdots & \vdots & \vdots & \vdots & \vdots & \vdots & \vdots \\
\hline & 0 & 1 & 2 & 3 & 4 & 5 & 6
\end{array}$$

we can see immediately that the only potentially non-trivial differentials are

$$\begin{align}
d_3:E_3^{0,2k} \to E_3^{3,2k-2} \\
d_3:E_3^{3,2k} \to E_3^{6,2k-2}
\end{align}$$

It turns out that these differentials vanish in both cases, hence $E_2 = E_\infty$. In the first case, since $Sq^k:H^i(X;\mathbb{Z}/2) \to H^{k+i}(X;\mathbb{Z}/2)$ is trivial for $k > i$ we have the first set of differentials are zero. The second set are trivial because $Sq^2$ sends $H^3(X;\mathbb{Z}/2) \to H^5(X) = 0$ the identification $Sq^3 = \beta \circ Sq^2 \circ r$ shows the differential is trivial.

=== Twisted K-theory ===
The Atiyah–Hirzebruch spectral sequence can be used to compute twisted K-theory groups as well. In short, twisted K-theory is the group completion of the isomorphism classes of vector bundles defined by gluing data $(U_{ij},g_{ij})$ where

$$g_{ij}g_{jk}g_{ki} = \lambda_{ijk}$$

for some cohomology class $\lambda \in H^3(X,\mathbb{Z})$. Then, the spectral sequence reads as

$$E_2^{p,q} = H^p(X;KU^q(*)) \Rightarrow KU^{p+q}_\lambda(X)$$

but with different differentials. For example,

$$E_3^{p,q} = E_2^{p,q} = \begin{array}{c|cccc}
\vdots & \vdots & \vdots & \vdots & \vdots \\
2 & H^0(S^3;\mathbb{Z}) & 0 & 0 & H^3(S^3;\mathbb{Z}) \\
1 & 0 & 0 & 0 & 0 \\
0 & H^0(S^3;\mathbb{Z}) & 0 & 0 & H^3(S^3;\mathbb{Z}) \\
-1 & 0 & 0 & 0 & 0 \\
-2 & H^0(S^3;\mathbb{Z}) & 0 & 0 & H^3(S^3;\mathbb{Z}) \\
\vdots & \vdots & \vdots & \vdots & \vdots \\
\hline& 0 & 1 & 2 & 3
\end{array}$$

On the $E_3$-page the differential is

$$d_3 = Sq^3 + \lambda$$

Higher odd-dimensional differentials $d_{2k+1}$ are given by Massey products for twisted K-theory tensored by $\mathbb{R}$. So

$$\begin{align}
d_5 &= \{ \lambda, \lambda, - \} \\
d_7 &= \{ \lambda, \lambda, \lambda, - \}
\end{align}$$

Note that if the underlying space is formal, meaning its rational homotopy type is determined by its rational cohomology, hence has vanishing Massey products, then the odd-dimensional differentials are zero. Pierre Deligne, Phillip Griffiths, John Morgan, and Dennis Sullivan proved this for all compact Kähler manifolds, hence $E_\infty = E_4$ in this case. In particular, this includes all smooth projective varieties.

==== Twisted K-theory of 3-sphere ====
The twisted K-theory for $S^3$ can be readily computed. First of all, since $Sq^3 = \beta \circ Sq^2 \circ r$ and $H^2(S^3) = 0$, we have that the differential on the $E_3$-page is just cupping with the class given by $\lambda$. This gives the computation

$$KU_\lambda^k = \begin{cases}
\mathbb{Z} & k \text{ is even} \\
\mathbb{Z}/\lambda & k \text{ is odd}
\end{cases}$$

=== Rational bordism ===
Recall that the rational bordism group $\Omega_*^{\text{SO}}\otimes \mathbb{Q}$ is isomorphic to the ring

$$\mathbb{Q}[[\mathbb{CP}^0], [\mathbb{CP}^2], [\mathbb{CP}^4],[\mathbb{CP}^6],\ldots]$$

generated by the bordism classes of the (complex) even dimensional projective spaces $[\mathbb{CP}^{2k}]$ in degree $4k$. This gives a computationally tractable spectral sequence for computing the rational bordism groups.

=== Complex cobordism ===
Recall that $MU^*(pt) = \mathbb{Z}[x_1,x_2,\ldots]$ where $x_i \in \pi_{2i}(MU)$. Then, we can use this to compute the complex cobordism of a space $X$ via the spectral sequence. We have the $E_2$-page given by

$$E_2^{p,q} = H^p(X;MU^q(pt))$$

== See also ==
- Quillen–Lichtenbaum conjecture
