= Serre–Swan theorem =

Relates the geometric vector bundles to algebraic projective modules

In the mathematical fields of differential geometry, topology and algebraic geometry, the Serre–Swan theorem, also called Swan's theorem, relates the geometric notion of vector bundles to the algebraic concept of projective modules and gives rise to a common intuition throughout mathematics: "projective modules are like vector bundles".

The three precise formulations of the theorem differ somewhat. The original theorem, as proved by Jean-Pierre Serre in 1955, is more algebraic in nature, and concerns vector bundles on an algebraic variety over an algebraically closed field (of any characteristic). Richard Swan in 1962 proved an analytic variant, concerning smooth vector bundles on a smooth manifold (real, complex, or quaternionic). His topological variant is about continuous (real or complex) vector bundles on a compact Hausdorff space.

== Differential geometry ==
Suppose M is a smooth manifold (not necessarily compact), and E is a smooth vector bundle over M of finite rank. Then Γ(E), the space of smooth sections of E, is a module over C^{∞}(M) (the commutative algebra of smooth real-valued functions on M). Swan's theorem states that this module is finitely generated and projective over C^{∞}(M). In other words, every vector bundle is a direct summand of some trivial bundle: $M \times \R^k$ for some k. The theorem can be proved by constructing a bundle epimorphism from a trivial bundle $M \times \R^k \to E.$ This can be done by, for instance, exhibiting sections s_{1}...s_{k} with the property that for each point p, {s_{i}(p)} span the fiber over p.

When M is connected, the converse is also true: every finitely generated projective module over C^{∞}(M) arises in this way from some smooth vector bundle on M. Such a module can be viewed as a smooth function f on M with values in the n × n idempotent matrices for some n. The fiber of the corresponding vector bundle over x is then the range of f(x). If M is not connected, the converse does not hold unless one allows for vector bundles of non-constant rank (which means admitting manifolds of non-constant dimension). For example, if M is a zero-dimensional 2-point manifold, the module $\R\oplus 0$ is finitely-generated and projective over $C^\infty(M)\cong\R\times\R$ but is not free, and so cannot correspond to the sections of any (constant-rank) vector bundle over M (all of which are trivial).

Another way of stating the above theorem is that for any connected smooth manifold M, the section functor Γ from the category of smooth vector bundles over M to the category of finitely generated, projective C^{∞}(M)-modules is full, faithful, and essentially surjective. Therefore the category of smooth vector bundles on M is equivalent to the category of finitely generated, projective C^{∞}(M)-modules. Details may be found in (Nestruev 2003).

== Topology ==
Suppose X is a compact Hausdorff space, and C(X) is the ring of continuous real-valued functions on X. Analogous to the result above, the category of real finite-rank vector bundles on X is equivalent to the category of finitely generated projective modules over C(X). The same result holds if one replaces "real-valued" by "complex-valued" and "real vector bundle" by "complex vector bundle", but it does not hold if one replace the field by a totally disconnected field like the rational numbers.

In detail, let Vec(X) be the category of complex vector bundles over X, and let ProjMod(C(X)) be the category of finitely generated projective modules over the C*-algebra C(X). There is a functor Γ : Vec(X) → ProjMod(C(X)) which sends each complex vector bundle E over X to the C(X)-module Γ(X, E) of sections. If $\tau : (E_1, \pi_1) \to (E_2, \pi_2)$ is a morphism of vector bundles over X then $\pi_2 \circ \tau = \pi_1$ and it follows that

$$\forall s \in \Gamma(X, E_1) \quad \pi_2 \circ \tau \circ s = \pi_1 \circ s = \text{id}_X,$$

giving the map

$$\begin{cases} \Gamma \tau : \Gamma(X, E_1) \to \Gamma(X, E_2) \\ s \mapsto \tau \circ s \end{cases}$$

which respects the module structure (Várilly, 97). Swan's theorem asserts that the functor Γ is an equivalence of categories.

== Algebraic geometry ==
The analogous result in algebraic geometry, due to Serre (1955, §50) applies to vector bundles in the category of affine varieties over an algebraically closed field. Let X be an affine variety with structure sheaf $\mathcal{O}_X,$ and $\mathcal{F}$ a coherent sheaf of $\mathcal{O}_X$ -modules on X. Then $\mathcal{F}$ is the sheaf of germs of a finite-dimensional vector bundle if and only if $\Gamma(\mathcal{F}, X),$ the space of sections of $\mathcal{F},$ is a projective module over the commutative ring $A = \Gamma(\mathcal{O}_X, X).$
