= Daniel Quillen =

American mathematician (1940–2011)

- Born: June 22, 1940; Orange, New Jersey, U.S.
- Died: April 30, 2011 (aged 70); Gainesville, Florida, U.S.
- Known for: Algebraic K-theory (Quillen's Q-construction), Quillen–Suslin theorem, Bass–Quillen conjecture, rational homotopy theory, Quillen determinant line bundle, Mathai–Quillen formalism, Quillen's lemma, Quillen metric, Quillen's theorems A and B, Kan–Quillen model structure
- Awards: Fields Medal (1978); Cole Prize (1975); Putnam Fellow (1959)
- Scientific career
- Fields: Mathematics
- Thesis: Formal Properties of Over-Determined Systems of Linear Partial Differential Equations (1964)
- Doctoral advisor: Raoul Bott
- Doctoral students: Kenneth Brown; Varghese Mathai

Daniel Gray Quillen (June 22, 1940 – April 30, 2011) was an American mathematician. He is known for being the "prime architect" of higher algebraic K-theory, for which he was awarded the Cole Prize in 1975 and the Fields Medal in 1978.

From 1984 to 2006, he was the Waynflete Professor of Pure Mathematics at Magdalen College, Oxford.

== Education and career ==
Quillen was born in Orange, New Jersey, and attended Newark Academy. He entered Harvard University, where he earned both his AB, in 1961, and his PhD, in 1964, degrees; the latter was completed under the supervision of Raoul Bott, with a thesis in partial differential equations. He was a Putnam Fellow in 1959.

Quillen obtained a position at the Massachusetts Institute of Technology after completing his doctorate. He also spent a number of years at several other universities. He visited France twice: first as a Sloan Fellow in Paris, during the academic year 1968–69, where he was greatly influenced by Grothendieck, and then, during 1973–74, as a Guggenheim Fellow. In 1969–70, he was a visiting member of the Institute for Advanced Study in Princeton, where he came under the influence of Sir Michael Atiyah.

In 1978, Quillen received a Fields Medal at the International Congress of Mathematicians held in Helsinki.

From 1984 to 2006, he was the Waynflete Professor of Pure Mathematics at Magdalen College, Oxford.

Quillen retired at the end of 2006. He died from complications of Alzheimer's disease on April 30, 2011, aged 70.

== Mathematical contributions ==
Quillen's best known contribution (mentioned specifically in his Fields medal citation) was his formulation of higher algebraic K-theory in 1972. This new tool, formulated in terms of homotopy theory, proved to be successful in formulating and solving problems in algebra, particularly in ring theory and module theory. More generally, Quillen developed tools (especially his theory of model categories and in particular the Kan–Quillen model structure) that allowed algebro-topological tools to be applied in other contexts.

Before his work in defining higher algebraic K-theory, Quillen worked on the Adams conjecture, formulated by Frank Adams, in homotopy theory. His proof of the conjecture used techniques from the modular representation theory of groups, which he later applied to work on cohomology of groups and algebraic K-theory. He also worked on complex cobordism, showing that its formal group law is essentially the universal one.

In related work, he also supplied a proof of Serre's conjecture about the triviality of algebraic vector bundles on affine space, which led to the Bass–Quillen conjecture. He was also an architect (along with Dennis Sullivan) of rational homotopy theory.

He introduced the Quillen determinant line bundle and the Mathai–Quillen formalism.

== See also ==
- Friedhelm Waldhausen

== Selected publications ==
- Quillen, Daniel G. "Homology of commutative rings". unpublished notes. Archived from the original on 2015-04-20.
- Quillen, Daniel G. (1967). Homotopical Algebra. Lecture Notes in Mathematics. Vol. 43. Berlin, New York: Springer-Verlag. doi:10.1007/BFb0097438. ISBN 978-3-540-03914-3. MR 0223432.
- Quillen, Daniel (1969). "On the formal group laws of unoriented and complex cobordism theory". Bulletin of the American Mathematical Society. 75 (6): 1293–1298. doi:10.1090/S0002-9904-1969-12401-8. MR 0253350.
- Quillen, D. (1969). "Rational homotopy theory". Annals of Mathematics. 90 (2): 205–295. doi:10.2307/1970725. JSTOR 1970725. MR 0258031.
- Quillen, Daniel (1971). "The Adams conjecture". Topology. 10: 67–80. doi:10.1016/0040-9383(71)90018-8. ISSN 0040-9383. MR 0279804.
- Quillen, Daniel (1971). "The spectrum of an equivariant cohomology ring. I". Annals of Mathematics. Second Series. 94 (3): 549–572. doi:10.2307/1970770. ISSN 0003-486X. JSTOR 1970770. MR 0298694.
- Quillen, Daniel (1971). "The spectrum of an equivariant cohomology ring. II". Annals of Mathematics. Second Series. 94 (3): 573–602. doi:10.2307/1970770. ISSN 0003-486X. JSTOR 1970771. MR 0298694.
- Quillen, Daniel (1973). "Higher algebraic K-theory. I". Algebraic K-theory, I: Higher K-theories (Proc. Conf., Battelle Memorial Inst., Seattle, Wash., 1972). Lecture Notes in Math. Vol. 341. Berlin, New York: Springer-Verlag. pp. 85–147. doi:10.1007/BFb0067053. ISBN 978-3-540-06434-3. MR 0338129.
- Quillen, Daniel (1975). "Higher algebraic K-theory". Proceedings of the International Congress of Mathematicians (Vancouver, B. C., 1974), Vol. 1. Montreal, Quebec: Canad. Math. Congress. pp. 171–176. MR 0422392. (Quillen's Q-construction)
- Quillen, Daniel (1974). "Higher K-theory for categories with exact sequences". New developments in topology (Proc. Sympos. Algebraic Topology, Oxford, 1972). London Math. Soc. Lecture Note Ser. Vol. 11. Cambridge University Press. pp. 95–103. MR 0335604.
- Quillen, Daniel (1976). "Projective modules over polynomial rings". Inventiones Mathematicae. 36: 167–171. Bibcode:1976InMat..36..167Q. doi:10.1007/BF01390008. S2CID 119678534.
- Quillen, Daniel (1985). "Superconnections and the Chern character". Topology. 24 (1): 89–95. doi:10.1016/0040-9383(85)90047-3. ISSN 0040-9383. MR 0790678.
