= Classifying space for SO(n) =

In mathematics, the classifying space $\operatorname{BSO}(n)$ for the special orthogonal group $\operatorname{SO}(n)$ is the base space of the universal $\operatorname{SO}(n)$ principal bundle $\operatorname{ESO}(n)\rightarrow\operatorname{BSO}(n)$. This means that $\operatorname{SO}(n)$ principal bundles over a CW complex up to isomorphism are in bijection with homotopy classes of its continuous maps into $\operatorname{BSO}(n)$. The isomorphism is given by pullback. A particular application are principal SO(2)-bundles.

== Definition ==
There is a canonical inclusion of real oriented Grassmannians given by $\widetilde\operatorname{Gr}_n(\mathbb{R}^k)\hookrightarrow\widetilde\operatorname{Gr}_n(\mathbb{R}^{k+1}), V\mapsto V\times\{0\}$. Its colimit is:

$$\operatorname{BSO}(n)
:=\widetilde\operatorname{Gr}_n(\mathbb{R}^\infty)
:=\lim_{k\rightarrow\infty}\widetilde\operatorname{Gr}_n(\mathbb{R}^k).$$

Since real oriented Grassmannians can be expressed as a homogeneous space by:

$$\widetilde\operatorname{Gr}_n(\mathbb{R}^k)
=\operatorname{SO}(n+k)/(\operatorname{SO}(n)\times\operatorname{SO}(k))$$

the group structure carries over to $\operatorname{BSO}(n)$.

== Simplest classifying spaces ==
- Since $\operatorname{SO}(1) \cong 1$ is the trivial group, $\operatorname{BSO}(1) \cong\{*\}$ is the trivial topological space.
- Since $\operatorname{SO}(2) \cong\operatorname{U}(1)$, one has $\operatorname{BSO}(2) \cong\operatorname{BU}(1) \cong\mathbb{C}P^\infty$.

== Classification of principal bundles ==
Given a topological space $X$ the set of $\operatorname{SO}(n)$ principal bundles on it up to isomorphism is denoted $\operatorname{Prin}_{\operatorname{SO}(n)}(X)$. If $X$ is a CW complex, then the map:

$$[X,\operatorname{BSO}(n)]\rightarrow\operatorname{Prin}_{\operatorname{SO}(n)}(X),
[f]\mapsto f^*\operatorname{ESO}(n)$$

is bijective.

== Cohomology ring ==
The cohomology ring of $\operatorname{BSO}(n)$ with coefficients in the field $\mathbb{Z}_2$ of two elements is generated by the Stiefel–Whitney classes:

$$H^*(\operatorname{BSO}(n);\mathbb{Z}_2)
=\mathbb{Z}_2[w_2,\ldots,w_n].$$

The results holds more generally for every ring with characteristic $\operatorname{char}=2$.

The cohomology ring of $\operatorname{BSO}(n)$ with coefficients in the field $\mathbb{Q}$ of rational numbers is generated by Pontrjagin classes and Euler class:

$$H^*(\operatorname{BSO}(2n);\mathbb{Q})
\cong\mathbb{Q}[p_1,\ldots,p_n,e]/(p_n-e^2),$$
$$H^*(\operatorname{BSO}(2n+1);\mathbb{Q})
\cong\mathbb{Q}[p_1,\ldots,p_n].$$

== Infinite classifying space ==
The canonical inclusions $\operatorname{SO}(n)\hookrightarrow\operatorname{SO}(n+1)$ induce canonical inclusions $\operatorname{BSO}(n)\hookrightarrow\operatorname{BSO}(n+1)$ on their respective classifying spaces. Their respective colimits are denoted as:

$$\operatorname{SO}
:=\lim_{n\rightarrow\infty}\operatorname{SO}(n);$$
$$\operatorname{BSO}
:=\lim_{n\rightarrow\infty}\operatorname{BSO}(n).$$

$\operatorname{BSO}$ is indeed the classifying space of $\operatorname{SO}$.

== See also ==
- Classifying space for O(n)
- Classifying space for U(n)
- Classifying space for SU(n)

== Literature ==
- Milnor, John W.; Stasheff, James D. (1974). Characteristic Classes. Annals of Mathematics Studies. Vol. 76. Princeton University Press; University of Tokyo Press. ISBN 978-0-691-08122-9. MR 0440554.
- Lawson, H. Blaine; Michelsohn, Marie-Louise (1990-02-21). Spin Geometry. Princeton University Press. ISBN 9780691085425.
- Hatcher, Allen (2002). Algebraic topology. Cambridge: Cambridge University Press. ISBN 0-521-79160-X.
- Mitchell, Stephen (August 2001). Universal principal bundles and classifying spaces (PDF).
