= Classifying space for SU(n) =

In mathematics, the classifying space $\operatorname{BSU}(n)$ for the special unitary group $\operatorname{SU}(n)$ is the base space of the universal $\operatorname{SU}(n)$ principal bundle $\operatorname{ESU}(n)\rightarrow\operatorname{BSU}(n)$. This means that $\operatorname{SU}(n)$ principal bundles over a CW complex up to isomorphism are in bijection with homotopy classes of its continuous maps into $\operatorname{BSU}(n)$. The isomorphism is given by pullback. A particular application are principal SU(2)-bundles.

== Definition ==
There is a canonical inclusion of complex oriented Grassmannians given by $\widetilde\operatorname{Gr}_n(\mathbb{C}^k)\hookrightarrow\widetilde\operatorname{Gr}_n(\mathbb{C}^{k+1}), V\mapsto V\times\{0\}$. Its colimit is:

$\operatorname{BSU}(n) :=\widetilde\operatorname{Gr}_n(\mathbb{C}^\infty) :=\lim_{k\rightarrow\infty}\widetilde\operatorname{Gr}_n(\mathbb{C}^k).$

Since real oriented Grassmannians can be expressed as a homogeneous space by:

$$\widetilde\operatorname{Gr}_n(\mathbb{C}^k)
=\operatorname{SU}(n+k)/(\operatorname{SU}(n)\times\operatorname{SU}(k))$$

the group structure carries over to $\operatorname{BSU}(n)$.

== Simplest classifying spaces ==
- Since $\operatorname{SU}(1) \cong 1$ is the trivial group, $\operatorname{BSU}(1) \cong\{*\}$ is the trivial topological space.
- Since $\operatorname{SU}(2) \cong\operatorname{Sp}(1)$, one has $\operatorname{BSU}(2) \cong\operatorname{BSp}(1) \cong\mathbb{H}P^\infty$.

== Classification of principal bundles ==
Given a topological space $X$ the set of $\operatorname{SU}(n)$ principal bundles on it up to isomorphism is denoted $\operatorname{Prin}_{\operatorname{SU}(n)}(X)$. If $X$ is a CW complex, then the map:

$$[X,\operatorname{BSU}(n)]\rightarrow\operatorname{Prin}_{\operatorname{SU}(n)}(X),
[f]\mapsto f^*\operatorname{ESU}(n)$$

is bijective.

== Cohomology ring ==
The cohomology ring of $\operatorname{BSU}(n)$ with coefficients in the ring $\mathbb{Z}$ of integers is generated by the Chern classes:

$$H^*(\operatorname{BSU}(n);\mathbb{Z})
=\mathbb{Z}[c_2,\ldots,c_n].$$

== Infinite classifying space ==
The canonical inclusions $\operatorname{SU}(n)\hookrightarrow\operatorname{SU}(n+1)$ induce canonical inclusions $\operatorname{BSU}(n)\hookrightarrow\operatorname{BSU}(n+1)$ on their respective classifying spaces. Their respective colimits are denoted as:

$$\operatorname{SU}
:=\lim_{n\rightarrow\infty}\operatorname{SU}(n);$$
$$\operatorname{BSU}
:=\lim_{n\rightarrow\infty}\operatorname{BSU}(n).$$

$\operatorname{BSU}$ is indeed the classifying space of $\operatorname{SU}$.

== See also ==
- Classifying space for O(n)
- Classifying space for SO(n)
- Classifying space for U(n)

== Literature ==
- Hatcher, Allen (2002). Algebraic topology. Cambridge: Cambridge University Press. ISBN 0-521-79160-X.
- Mitchell, Stephen (August 2001). Universal principal bundles and classifying spaces (PDF).
