= Principal U(1)-bundle =

Special type of principal bundle

Composition in the first unitary group

In mathematics, especially differential geometry, principal $\operatorname{U}(1)$-bundles (or principal $\operatorname{SO}(2)$-bundles) are special principal bundles with the first unitary group $\operatorname{U}(1)$ (isomorphic to the second special orthogonal group $\operatorname{SO}(2)$) as structure group. Topologically, it has the structure of the one-dimensional sphere, hence principal $\operatorname{U}(1)$-bundles without their group action are in particular circle bundles. These are basically topological spaces with a circle glued to every point, so that all of them are connected with each other, but globally aren't necessarily a product and can instead be twisted like a Möbius strip.

Principal $\operatorname{U}(1)$-bundles are used in many areas of mathematics, for example for the formulation of the Seiberg–Witten equations or monopole Floer homology. Since $\operatorname{U}(1)$ is the gauge group of the electromagnetic interaction, principal $\operatorname{U}(1)$-bundles are also of interest in theoretical physics. Concretely, the $\operatorname{U}(1)$-Yang–Mills equations are exactly Maxwell's equations. In particular, principal $\operatorname{U}(1)$-bundles over the two-dimensional sphere $S^2$, which include the complex Hopf fibration, can be used to describe hypothetical magnetic monopoles in three dimensions, known as Dirac monopoles, see also two-dimensional Yang–Mills theory.

== Definition ==
Principal $\operatorname{U}(1)$-bundles are generalizations of canonical projections $B\times\operatorname{U}(1)\twoheadrightarrow B$ for topological spaces $B$, so that the source is not globally a product but only locally. More concretely, a continuous map $p\colon E\twoheadrightarrow B$ with a continuous right group action $E\times\operatorname{U}(1)\rightarrow E$, which preserves all preimages of points, hence $p(eg)=p(e)$ for all $e\in E$ and $g\in G$, and also acts free and transitive on all preimages of points, which makes all of them homeomorphic to $\operatorname{U}(1)$, is a principal $\operatorname{U}(1)$-bundle.

Since principal bundles are in particular fiber bundles with the group action missing, their nomenclature can be transferred. $E$ is also called the total space and $B$ is also called the base space. Preimages of points are then the fibers. Since $\operatorname{U}(1)$ is a Lie group, hence in particular a smooth manifold, the base space $B$ is often chosen to be a smooth manifold as well since this automatically makes the total space $E$ into a smooth manifold as well.

== Classification ==
Principal $\operatorname{U}(1)$-bundles can be fully classified using the classifying space $\operatorname{BU}(1)$ of the first unitary group $\operatorname{U}(1)$, which is exactly the infinite complex projective space $\mathbb{C}P^\infty\!$. For a topological space $B$, let $\operatorname{Prin}_{\operatorname{U}(1)}(B)$ denote the set of equivalence classes of principal $\operatorname{U}(1)$-bundles over it, then there is a bijection with homotopy classes:

$$\operatorname{Prin}_{\operatorname{U}(1)}(B)
\cong[B,\operatorname{BU}(1)]
\cong[B,\mathbb{C}P^\infty].$$

$\mathbb{C}P^\infty$ is a CW complex with its $n$-skeleton being $\mathbb{C}P^k$ for the largest natural number $k\in\mathbb{N}$ with $2k\leq n$. For a $n$-dimensional CW complex $B$, the cellular approximation theorem states that every continuous map $B\rightarrow\mathbb{C}P^\infty$ is homotopic to a cellular map factoring over the canonical inclusion $\mathbb{C}P^k\hookrightarrow\mathbb{C}P^\infty\!$. As a result, the induced map $[B,\mathbb{C}P^k]\hookrightarrow[B,\mathbb{C}P^\infty]$ is surjective, but not necessarily injective as higher cells of $\mathbb{C}P^\infty$ allow additional homotopies. In particular if $B$ is a CW complex of three or less dimensions, then $k=1$ and with $\mathbb{C}P^1 \cong S^2$, there is a connection to cohomotopy sets with a surjective map:

$$\pi^2(B)\rightarrow\operatorname{Prin}_{\operatorname{U}(1)}(B).$$

$\mathbb{C}P^\infty$ is also the Eilenberg–MacLane space $K(\mathbb{Z},2)$, which represents singular cohomology, compare to Brown's representability theorem:

$$\operatorname{Prin}_{\operatorname{U}(1)}(B)
\cong H^2(B,\mathbb{Z}).$$

(The composition $\pi^2(B)\rightarrow H^2(B,\mathbb{Z})$ is the Hurewicz map.) A corresponding isomorphism is given by the first Chern class. Although characteristic classes are defined for vector bundles, it is possible to also define them for certain principal bundles.

== Associated vector bundle ==
Given a principal $\operatorname{U}(1)$-bundle $E\twoheadrightarrow B$, there is an associated vector bundle $E\times_{\operatorname{U}(1)}\C\twoheadrightarrow B$. Intuitively, the spheres at every point are filled over the canonical inclusions $\operatorname{U}(1)\subset\mathbb{C}$. Due to the single rank, the vector bundle is only described by the first Chern class $c_1\colon\operatorname{Vect}_\mathbb{C}(B)\rightarrow H^2(B,\mathbb{Z})$, which is an isomorphism over CW complexes.

Principal bundles also have an adjoint vector bundle, which is trivial for principal $\operatorname{U}(1)$-bundles.

== Examples ==
- By definition of complex projective space, the canonical projection $S^{2n+1}\twoheadrightarrow\mathbb{C}P^n$ is a principal $\operatorname{U}(1)$-bundle. With $\mathbb{C}P^1\cong S^2$, known as the Riemann sphere, the complex Hopf fibration $h_\mathbb{C}\colon S^3\twoheadrightarrow S^2$ is a special case. For the general case, the classifying map is the canonical inclusion:

$$\mathbb{C}P^n\hookrightarrow\mathbb{C}P^\infty
\cong\operatorname{BU}(1).$$

- One has $S^{2n+1} \cong\operatorname{U}(n+1)/\operatorname{U}(n)$, which means that there is a principal $\operatorname{U}(1)$-bundle $\operatorname{U}(2)\twoheadrightarrow S^3\!$. Such bundles are classified by:

$$\pi_3\operatorname{BU}(1)
\cong\pi_2\operatorname{U}(1)
\cong\pi_2S^1
\cong 1.$$

Hence the bundle is trivial, which fits that $\operatorname{SU}(2)\cong S^3$ and $\operatorname{U}(n)\cong\operatorname{SU}(n)\times\operatorname{U}(1)$.

- One has $S^n \cong\operatorname{SO}(n+1)/\operatorname{SO}(n)$, which means that (using $\operatorname{U}(1) \cong\operatorname{SO}(2)$) there is a principal $\operatorname{U}(1)$-bundle $\operatorname{SO}(3)\twoheadrightarrow S^2$. Such bundles are classified by:

$$\pi_2\operatorname{BU}(1)
\cong\pi_1\operatorname{U}(1)
\cong\pi_1S^1
\cong\mathbb{Z}.$$

One has $\operatorname{SO}(3)\cong\mathbb{R}P^3$ and the composition of the canonical double cover $S^3\twoheadrightarrow\mathbb{R}P^3$ with the principal bundle $\mathbb{R}P^3\twoheadrightarrow S^2$ is exactly the complex Hopf fibration $S^3\twoheadrightarrow S^2$. Since the first Chern class of the complex Hopf fibration is $-1$, the first Chern class of the principal bundle $\mathbb{R}P^3\twoheadrightarrow S^2$ is $-2$.

== See also ==
- Principal SU(2)-bundle

== Literature ==
- Freed, Daniel S.; Uhlenbeck, Karen K. (1984). Instantons and Four-Manifolds. Mathematical Sciences Research Institute Publications. Vol. 1. New York: Springer. doi:10.1007/978-1-4613-9703-8. ISBN 978-1-4613-9703-8.
- Hatcher, Allen (2001). Algebraic Topology. Cambridge University Press. ISBN 0-521-79160-X. Archived from the original on January 3, 2002.
- Mitchell, Stephen (2011). "Notes on principal bundles and classifying spaces" (PDF).
- Hatcher, Allen (2017). Vector Bundles and K-Theory (PDF).
