= Classifying space for U(n) =

Exact homotopy case

In mathematics, the classifying space for the unitary group U(n) is a space BU(n) together with a universal bundle EU(n) such that any hermitian bundle on a paracompact space X is the pull-back of EU(n) by a map X → BU(n) unique up to homotopy. A particular application are principal U(1)-bundles.

This space with its universal fibration may be constructed as either

1. the Grassmannian of n-planes in an infinite-dimensional complex Hilbert space; or,
2. the direct limit, with the induced topology, of Grassmannians of n planes.

Both constructions are detailed here.

== Construction as an infinite Grassmannian ==
The total space EU(n) of the universal bundle is given by

$$EU(n)=\left \{e_1,\ldots,e_n \ : \ (e_i,e_j)=\delta_{ij}, e_i\in H \right \}.$$

Here, H denotes an infinite-dimensional complex Hilbert space, the e_{i} are vectors in H, and $\delta_{ij}$ is the Kronecker delta. The symbol $(\cdot,\cdot)$ is the inner product on H. Thus, we have that EU(n) is the space of orthonormal n-frames in H.

The group action of U(n) on this space is the natural one. The base space is then

$$BU(n)=EU(n)/U(n)$$

and is the set of Grassmannian n-dimensional subspaces (or n-planes) in H. That is,

$$BU(n) = \{ V \subset H \ : \ \dim V = n \}$$

so that V is an n-dimensional vector space.

=== Case of line bundles ===
For n = 1, one has EU(1) = S^{∞}, which is known to be a contractible space. The base space is then BU(1) = CP^{∞}, the infinite-dimensional complex projective space. Thus, the set of isomorphism classes of circle bundles over a manifold M are in one-to-one correspondence with the homotopy classes of maps from M to CP^{∞}.

One also has the relation that

$$BU(1)= PU(H),$$

that is, BU(1) is the infinite-dimensional projective unitary group. See that article for additional discussion and properties.

For a torus T, which is abstractly isomorphic to U(1) × ... × U(1), but need not have a chosen identification, one writes BT.

The topological K-theory K_{0}(BT) is given by numerical polynomials; more details below.

== Construction as an inductive limit ==
Let F_{n}(C^{k}) be the space of orthonormal families of n vectors in C^{k} and let G_{n}(C^{k}) be the Grassmannian of n-dimensional subvector spaces of C^{k}. The total space of the universal bundle can be taken to be the direct limit of the F_{n}(C^{k}) as k → ∞, while the base space is the direct limit of the G_{n}(C^{k}) as k → ∞.

=== Validity of the construction ===
In this section, we will define the topology on EU(n) and prove that EU(n) is indeed contractible.

The group U(n) acts freely on F_{n}(C^{k}) and the quotient is the Grassmannian G_{n}(C^{k}). The map

$$\begin{align}
F_n(\mathbf{C}^k) & \longrightarrow \mathbf{S}^{2k-1} \\
(e_1,\ldots,e_n) & \longmapsto e_n
\end{align}$$

is a fibre bundle of fibre F_{n−1}(C^{k−1}). Thus because $\pi_p(\mathbf{S}^{2k-1})$ is trivial and because of the long exact sequence of the fibration, we have

$$\pi_p(F_n(\mathbf{C}^k))=\pi_p(F_{n-1}(\mathbf{C}^{k-1}))$$

whenever $p\leq 2k-2$. By taking k big enough, precisely for $k>\tfrac{1}{2}p+n-1$, we can repeat the process and get

$$\pi_p(F_n(\mathbf{C}^k)) = \pi_p(F_{n-1}(\mathbf{C}^{k-1})) = \cdots = \pi_p(F_1(\mathbf{C}^{k+1-n})) = \pi_p(\mathbf{S}^{k-n}).$$

This last group is trivial for k > n + p. Let

$$EU(n)={\lim_{\to}}\;_{k\to\infty}F_n(\mathbf{C}^k)$$

be the direct limit of all the F_{n}(C^{k}) (with the induced topology). Let

$$G_n(\mathbf{C}^\infty)={\lim_\to}\;_{k\to\infty}G_n(\mathbf{C}^k)$$

be the direct limit of all the G_{n}(C^{k}) (with the induced topology).

Lemma: The group $\pi_p(EU(n))$ is trivial for all p ≥ 1.

Proof: Let γ : S^{p} → EU(n), since S^{p} is compact, there exists k such that γ(S^{p}) is included in F_{n}(C^{k}). By taking k big enough, we see that γ is homotopic, with respect to the base point, to the constant map.$\Box$

In addition, U(n) acts freely on EU(n). The spaces F_{n}(C^{k}) and G_{n}(C^{k}) are CW-complexes. One can find a decomposition of these spaces into CW-complexes such that the decomposition of F_{n}(C^{k}), resp. G_{n}(C^{k}), is induced by restriction of the one for F_{n}(C^{k+1}), resp. G_{n}(C^{k+1}). Thus EU(n) (and also G_{n}(C^{∞})) is a CW-complex. By Whitehead Theorem and the above Lemma, EU(n) is contractible.

== Cohomology of BU(n) ==
Proposition: The cohomology ring of $\operatorname{BU}(n)$ with coefficients in the ring $\mathbb{Z}$ of integers is generated by the Chern classes:

$$H^*(\operatorname{BU}(n);\mathbb{Z})
=\mathbb{Z}[c_1,\ldots,c_n].$$

Proof: Let us first consider the case n = 1. In this case, U(1) is the circle S^{1} and the universal bundle is S^{∞} → CP^{∞}. It is well known that the cohomology of CP^{k} is isomorphic to $\mathbb{Z}\lbrack c_1\rbrack/c_1^{k+1}$, where c_{1} is the Euler class of the U(1)-bundle S^{2k+1} → CP^{k}, and that the injections CP^{k} → CP^{k+1}, for k ∈ N*, are compatible with these presentations of the cohomology of the projective spaces. This proves the Proposition for n = 1.

There are homotopy fiber sequences

$$\mathbb{S}^{2n-1} \to B U(n-1) \to B U(n)$$

Concretely, a point of the total space $BU(n-1)$ is given by a point of the base space $BU(n)$ classifying a complex vector space $V$, together with a unit vector $u$ in $V$; together they classify $u^\perp < V$ while the splitting $V = (\mathbb{C} u) \oplus u^\perp$, trivialized by $u$, realizes the map $B U(n-1) \to B U(n)$ representing direct sum with $\mathbb{C}.$

Applying the Gysin sequence, one has a long exact sequence

$$H^p ( BU(n) ) \overset{\smile d_{2n} \eta}{\longrightarrow} H^{p+2n} ( BU(n) ) \overset{j^*}{\longrightarrow} H^{p+2n} (BU(n-1)) \overset{\partial}{\longrightarrow} H^{p+1}(BU(n)) \longrightarrow \cdots$$

where $\eta$ is the fundamental class of the fiber $\mathbb{S}^{2n-1}$. By properties of the Gysin Sequence, $j^*$ is a multiplicative homomorphism; by induction, $H^*BU(n-1)$ is generated by elements with $p < -1$, where $\partial$ must be zero, and hence where $j^*$ must be surjective. It follows that $j^*$ must always be surjective: by the universal property of polynomial rings, a choice of preimage for each generator induces a multiplicative splitting. Hence, by exactness, $\smile d_{2n}\eta$ must always be injective. We therefore have short exact sequences split by a ring homomorphism

$$0 \to H^p ( BU(n) ) \overset{\smile d_{2n} \eta}{\longrightarrow} H^{p+2n} ( BU(n) ) \overset{j^*}{\longrightarrow} H^{p+2n} (BU(n-1)) \to 0$$

Thus we conclude $H^*(BU(n)) = H^*(BU(n-1))[c_{2n}]$ where $c_{2n} = d_{2n} \eta$. This completes the induction.

== K-theory of BU(n) ==
Consider topological complex K-theory as the cohomology theory represented by the spectrum $KU$. In this case, $KU^*(BU(n))\cong \mathbb{Z}[t,t^{-1}][[c_1,...,c_n]]$, and $KU_*(BU(n))$ is the free $\mathbb{Z}[t,t^{-1}]$ module on $\beta_0$ and $\beta_{i_1}\ldots\beta_{i_r}$ for $n\geq i_j > 0$ and $r\leq n$. In this description, the product structure on $KU_*(BU(n))$ comes from the H-space structure of $BU$ given by Whitney sum of vector bundles. This product is called the Pontryagin product.

The topological K-theory is known explicitly in terms of numerical symmetric polynomials.

The K-theory reduces to computing K_{0}, since K-theory is 2-periodic by the Bott periodicity theorem, and BU(n) is a limit of complex manifolds, so it has a CW-structure with only cells in even dimensions, so odd K-theory vanishes.

Thus $K_*(X) = \pi_*(K) \otimes K_0(X)$, where $\pi_*(K)=\mathbf{Z}[t,t^{-1}]$, where t is the Bott generator.

K_{0}(BU(1)) is the ring of numerical polynomials in w, regarded as a subring of H_{∗}(BU(1); Q) = Q[w], where w is element dual to tautological bundle.

For the n-torus, K_{0}(BT^{n}) is numerical polynomials in n variables. The map K_{0}(BT^{n}) → K_{0}(BU(n)) is onto, via a splitting principle, as T^{n} is the maximal torus of U(n). The map is the symmetrization map

$$f(w_1,\dots,w_n) \mapsto \frac{1}{n!} \sum_{\sigma \in S_n} f(x_{\sigma(1)}, \dots, x_{\sigma(n)})$$

and the image can be identified as the symmetric polynomials satisfying the integrality condition that

$${n \choose n_1, n_2, \ldots, n_r}f(k_1,\dots,k_n) \in \mathbf{Z}$$

where

$${n \choose k_1, k_2, \ldots, k_m}  = \frac{n!}{k_1!\, k_2! \cdots k_m!}$$

is the multinomial coefficient and $k_1,\dots,k_n$ contains r distinct integers, repeated $n_1,\dots,n_r$ times, respectively.

== Infinite classifying space ==
The canonical inclusions $\operatorname{U}(n)\hookrightarrow\operatorname{U}(n+1)$ induce canonical inclusions $\operatorname{BU}(n)\hookrightarrow\operatorname{BU}(n+1)$ on their respective classifying spaces. Their respective colimits are denoted as:

$$\operatorname{U}
:=\lim_{n\rightarrow\infty}\operatorname{U}(n);$$
$$\operatorname{BU}
:=\lim_{n\rightarrow\infty}\operatorname{BU}(n).$$

$\operatorname{BU}$ is indeed the classifying space of $\operatorname{U}$.

== See also ==
- Classifying space for O(n)
- Classifying space for SO(n)
- Classifying space for SU(n)
- Topological K-theory
- Atiyah–Jänich theorem
