= Classifying space for O(n) =

In mathematics, the classifying space for the orthogonal group O(n) may be constructed as the Grassmannian of n-planes in an infinite-dimensional real space $\mathbb{R}^\infty$.

== Cohomology ring ==
The cohomology ring of $\operatorname{BO}(n)$ with coefficients in the field $\mathbb{Z}_2$ of two elements is generated by the Stiefel–Whitney classes:

$$H^*(\operatorname{BO}(n);\mathbb{Z}_2)
=\mathbb{Z}_2[w_1,\ldots,w_n].$$

== Infinite classifying space ==
The canonical inclusions $\operatorname{O}(n)\hookrightarrow\operatorname{O}(n+1)$ induce canonical inclusions $\operatorname{BO}(n)\hookrightarrow\operatorname{BO}(n+1)$ on their respective classifying spaces. Their respective colimits are denoted as:

$$\operatorname{O}
:=\lim_{n\rightarrow\infty}\operatorname{O}(n);$$
$$\operatorname{BO}
:=\lim_{n\rightarrow\infty}\operatorname{BO}(n).$$

$\operatorname{BO}$ is indeed the classifying space of $\operatorname{O}$.

== See also ==
- Classifying space for U(n)
- Classifying space for SO(n)
- Classifying space for SU(n)

== Literature ==
- Milnor, John W.; Stasheff, James D. (1974). Characteristic Classes. Annals of Mathematics Studies. Vol. 76. Princeton University Press; University of Tokyo Press. ISBN 978-0-691-08122-9. MR 0440554.
- Lawson, H. Blaine; Michelsohn, Marie-Louise (1990-02-21). Spin Geometry. Princeton University Press. ISBN 9780691085425.
- Hatcher, Allen (2002). Algebraic topology. Cambridge: Cambridge University Press. ISBN 0-521-79160-X.
- Mitchell, Stephen (August 2001). Universal principal bundles and classifying spaces (PDF).
