= Characteristic Classes =

1974 textbook by John Milnor and James Stasheff

- Author: John Milnor and Jim Stasheff
- Language: English
- Series: Annals of Mathematics Studies
- Publisher: Princeton University Press
- Publication date: 1974
- ISBN: 978-0-691-08122-9

Characteristic Classes is a mathematical textbook about characteristic classes. It is considered a standard work for this topic. It was written by John Milnor, who centrally used them in this construction of Milnor spheres awarded with the Field Medal in 1956, and James Stasheff. It was published on 24 August 1974.

== Content ==
Characteristic Classes first gives a short introduction into vector bundles and singular cohomology, which characteristic classes connect. On this basis, the construction of the basic characteristic classes is described, which includes Stiefel–Whitney classes, Chern classes, Pontrjagin classes and the Euler class. Afterwards, it descibres the applications, which includes those of Stiefel–Whitney numbers and Pontrjagin numbers for the classification of bordisms. It also describes minor characteristic classes like dual Stiefel–Whitney classes, integral Stiefel–Whitney classes, Wu classes and combinatorical Pontrjagin classes. Central results like the Thom isomorphism and Hirzebruch's signature theorem are also described.

== Background ==
In 1957, Jim Stasheff studied at Princeton University, where John Milnor had obtained his PhD in 1954 and still continued to work. During a lecture from Milnor about characteristic classes, Stasheff wrote notes, which were later expanded and published as a textbook 17 years later. ("The text which follows is based mostly on lectures at Princeton University in 1957. The senior author wishes to apologize for the delay in publication.") Eduard Stiefel, Hassler Whitney, Shing-shen Chern and Lew Pontrjagin by then were all still active in research and the textbook was dedicated to them. ("We are happy to report that the four original creators of characteristic class theory all remain mathematically active. [....] This book is dedicated to them.")

== Reviews ==
When John Milnor was awarded the Steele Prize in 2004, his works and contributions to mathematical literature were emphasized: His "ease is the mark of a master", so that an "improvement of Milnor's treatments often seems impossible". With this, he "set a standard of clarity, elegance, and beauty for which every mathematician should strive".

Edwin Spanier found the textbook "an elegant treatment of the subject". He wrote about any prior requirements: "The main concepts and results are lucidly presented and easily accessible. It is an excellent source for anyone who wants to learn or review the essentials of the subject." "The background is in algebraic and differential topology, differential geometry, algebraic geometry and global analysis." Even though the results come from mathematical physics, "background from physics is not given since it is not needed explicitly for the mathematical development". In summary, he concluded: "This book will be the basic reference. It will undoubtedly inspire future generations of mathematicians to attack some interesting and difficult questions."

== Literature ==
- Milnor, John Willard; Stasheff, James D. (1974), Characteristic Classes, Annals of Mathematics Studies, vol. 76, Princeton University Press; University of Tokyo Press, ISBN 978-0-691-08122-9, MR 0440554
