= Real projective space =

Type of topological space

In mathematics, real projective space, denoted $\mathbb{RP}^n$ or $\mathbb{P}_n(\R),$ is the topological space of lines passing through the origin 0 in the real space $\R^{n+1}.$ It is a compact, smooth manifold of dimension n, and is a special case $\mathbf{Gr}(1, \R^{n+1})$ of a Grassmannian space.

== Basic properties ==
=== Construction ===
Like all projective spaces, $\mathbb{RP}^n$ is formed by taking the quotient of $\R^{n+1}\setminus \{0\}$ under the equivalence relation $x\sim \lambda x$ for all real numbers $\lambda\neq 0$. For all $x$ in $\R^{n+1}\setminus \{0\}$ one can always find a $\lambda$ such that $\lambda x$ has norm 1. There are precisely two such $\lambda$ differing by sign. Thus, $\mathbb{RP}^n$ has the topology that is obtained by identifying antipodal points of the unit $n$-sphere, $S^n$, in $\R^{n+1}$.

One can alternatively restrict to the upper hemisphere of $S^n$ and merely identify antipodal points on the bounding equator. This shows that $\mathbb{RP}^n$ is also topologically equivalent to the closed $n$-dimensional disk, $D^n$, with antipodal points on the boundary, $\partial D^n=S^{n-1}$, identified.

=== Low-dimensional examples ===
- $\mathbb{RP}^1$ is called the real projective line, which is topologically equivalent to a circle. Thinking of points of $\mathbb{RP}^1$ as unit-norm complex numbers $z$ up to sign, the diffeomorphism $\mathbb{RP}^1 \to S^1$ is given by $z \mapsto z^2$. Geometrically, a line in $\mathbb{R}^2$ is parameterized by an angle $\theta \in [0, \pi]$ and the endpoints of this closed interval correspond to the same line.
- $\mathbb{RP}^2$ is called the real projective plane. This space cannot be embedded in $\mathbb{R}^3$. It can however be embedded in $\mathbb{R}^4$ and can be immersed in $\mathbb{R}^3$ (see here). The questions of embeddability and immersibility for projective $n$-space have been well-studied.
- $\mathbb{RP}^3$ is diffeomorphic to SO(3), hence admits a group structure; the covering map $S^3\to\mathbb{RP}^3$ is a map of groups Spin(3) → SO(3), where Spin(3) is a Lie group that is the universal cover of SO(3).

=== Topology ===
The antipodal map on the $n$-sphere (the map sending $x$ to $-x$) generates a Z_{2} group action on $S^n$. As mentioned above, the orbit space for this action is $\mathbb{RP}^n$. This action is actually a covering space action giving $S^n$ as a double cover of $\mathbb{RP}^n$. Since $S^n$ is simply connected for $n\geq 2$, it also serves as the universal cover in these cases. It follows that the fundamental group of $\mathbb{RP}^n$ is $\Z_2$ when $n> 1$. (When $n=1$ the fundamental group is $\Z$ due to the homeomorphism with $S^1$). A generator for the fundamental group is the closed curve obtained by projecting any curve connecting antipodal points in $S^n$ down to $\mathbb{RP}^n$.

The projective $n$-space is compact, connected, and has a fundamental group isomorphic to the cyclic group of order 2: its universal covering space is given by the antipody quotient map from the $n$-sphere, a simply connected space. It is a double cover. The antipode map on $\R^p$ has sign $(-1)^p$, so it is orientation-preserving if and only if $p$ is even. The orientation character is thus: the non-trivial loop in $\pi_1(\mathbb{RP}^n)$ acts as $(-1)^{n+1}$ on orientation, so $\mathbb{RP}^n$ is orientable if and only if $n+1$ is even, i.e., $n$ is odd.

The projective $n$-space is in fact diffeomorphic to the submanifold of $\R^{(n+1)^2}$ consisting of all symmetric $(n+1)\times(n+1)$ matrices of trace 1 that are also idempotent linear transformations.

== Geometry of real projective spaces ==
Real projective space admits a constant positive scalar curvature metric, coming from the double cover by the standard round sphere (the antipodal map is locally an isometry).

For the standard round metric, this has sectional curvature identically 1.

In the standard round metric, the measure of projective space is exactly half the measure of the sphere.

=== Smooth structure ===
Real projective spaces are smooth manifolds. On S^{n}, in homogeneous coordinates, (x_{1}, ..., x_{n+1}), consider the subset U_{i} with x_{i} ≠ 0. Each U_{i} is homeomorphic to the disjoint union of two open unit balls in R^{n} that map to the same subset of RP^{n} and the coordinate transition functions are smooth. This gives RP^{n} a smooth structure.

=== Structure as a CW complex ===
Real projective space RP^{n} admits the structure of a CW complex with 1 cell in every dimension.

In homogeneous coordinates (x_{1} ... x_{n+1}) on S^{n}, the coordinate neighborhood U_{1} = {(x_{1} ... x_{n+1}) | x_{1} ≠ 0} can be identified with the interior of n-disk D^{n}. When x_{i} = 0, one has RP^{n−1}. Therefore the n−1 skeleton of RP^{n} is RP^{n−1}, and the attaching map f : S^{n−1} → RP^{n−1} is the 2-to-1 covering map. One can put
$$\mathbf{RP}^n = \mathbf{RP}^{n-1} \cup_f D^n.$$

Induction shows that RP^{n} is a CW complex with 1 cell in every dimension up to n.

The cells are Schubert cells, as on the flag manifold. That is, take a complete flag (say the standard flag) 0 = V_{0} < V_{1} <...< V_{n}; then the closed k-cell is lines that lie in V_{k}. Also the open k-cell (the interior of the k-cell) is lines in V_{k} \ V_{k−1} (lines in V_{k} but not V_{k−1}).

In homogeneous coordinates (with respect to the flag), the cells are
$$\begin{array}{c}
[*:0:0:\dots:0] \\
{[}*:*:0:\dots:0] \\
\vdots \\
{[}*:*:*:\dots:*].
\end{array}$$

This is not a regular CW structure, as the attaching maps are 2-to-1. However, its cover is a regular CW structure on the sphere, with 2 cells in every dimension; indeed, the minimal regular CW structure on the sphere.

In light of the smooth structure, the existence of a Morse function would show RP^{n} is a CW complex. One such function is given by, in homogeneous coordinates,
$$g(x_1, \ldots, x_{n+1}) = \sum_{i=1} ^{n+1} i \cdot |x_i|^2.$$

On each neighborhood U_{i}, g has nondegenerate critical point (0,...,1,...,0) where 1 occurs in the i-th position with Morse index i. This shows RP^{n} is a CW complex with 1 cell in every dimension.

=== Tautological bundles ===
Real projective space has a natural line bundle over it, called the tautological bundle. More precisely, this is called the tautological subbundle, and there is also a dual n-dimensional bundle called the tautological quotient bundle.

== Algebraic topology of real projective spaces ==
=== Homotopy groups ===
The higher homotopy groups of RP^{n} are exactly the higher homotopy groups of S^{n}, via the long exact sequence on homotopy associated to a fibration.

Explicitly, the fiber bundle is:
$$\mathbf{Z}_2 \to S^n \to \mathbf{RP}^n.$$
You might also write this as
$$S^0 \to S^n \to \mathbf{RP}^n$$
or
$$O(1) \to S^n \to \mathbf{RP}^n$$
by analogy with complex projective space.

The homotopy groups are:
$$\pi_i (\mathbf{RP}^n) = \begin{cases}
0 & i = 0\\
\mathbf{Z}   & i = 1, n = 1\\
\mathbf{Z}/2\mathbf{Z} & i = 1, n > 1\\
\pi_i (S^n) & i > 1, n > 0.
\end{cases}$$

=== Homology ===
The cellular chain complex associated to the above CW structure has 1 cell in each dimension 0, ..., n. For each dimensional k, the boundary maps d_{k} : δD^{k} → RP^{k−1}/RP^{k−2} is the map that collapses the equator on S^{k−1} and then identifies antipodal points. In odd (resp. even) dimensions, this has degree 0 (resp. 2):

$$\deg(d_k) = 1 + (-1)^k.$$

Thus the integral homology is
$$H_i(\mathbf{RP}^n) = \begin{cases}
\mathbf{Z} & i = 0 \text{ or } i = n \text{ odd,}\\
\mathbf{Z}/2\mathbf{Z} & 0<i<n,\ i\ \text{odd,}\\
0 & \text{else.}
\end{cases}$$

RP^{n} is orientable if and only if n is odd, as the above homology calculation shows.

== Infinite real projective space ==
The infinite real projective space is constructed as the direct limit or union of the finite projective spaces:
$$\mathbf{RP}^\infty := \lim_n \mathbf{RP}^n.$$
This space is classifying space of O(1), the first orthogonal group.

The double cover of this space is the infinite sphere $S^\infty$, which is contractible. The infinite projective space is therefore the Eilenberg–MacLane space K(Z_{2}, 1).

For each nonnegative integer q, the modulo 2 homology group $H_q(\mathbf{RP}^\infty; \mathbf{Z}/2) = \mathbf{Z}/2$.

Its cohomology ring modulo 2 is
$$H^*(\mathbf{RP}^\infty; \mathbf{Z}/2\mathbf{Z}) = \mathbf{Z}/2\mathbf{Z}[w_1],$$
where $w_1$ is the first Stiefel–Whitney class: it is the free $\mathbf{Z}/2\mathbf{Z}$-algebra on $w_1$, which has degree 1.

Its cohomology ring with $\mathbf{Z}$ coefficients is
$$H^*(\mathbf{RP}^{\infty};\mathbf{Z}) = \mathbf{Z}[\alpha]/(2\alpha),$$
where $\alpha$ has degree 2. It can be deduced from the chain map between cellular cochain complexes with $\mathbf{Z}$ and $\mathbf{Z}/2$ coefficients, which yield a ring homomorphism
$$H^*(\mathbf{RP}^{\infty};\mathbf{Z}) \rightarrow H^*(\mathbf{RP}^{\infty};\mathbf{Z}/2\mathbf{Z})$$
injective in positive dimensions, with image the even dimensional part of $H^*(\mathbf{RP}^{\infty};\mathbf{Z}/2\mathbf{Z})$. Alternatively, the result can also be obtained using the Universal coefficient theorem.

== See also ==
- Complex projective space
- Quaternionic projective space
- Lens space
- Real projective plane
