= Atiyah–Bott formula =

On the cohomology ring of the moduli stack of principal bundles

In algebraic geometry, the Atiyah–Bott formula says the cohomology ring

$$\operatorname{H}^*(\operatorname{Bun}_G(X), \mathbb{Q}_l)$$

of the moduli stack of principal bundles is a free graded-commutative algebra on certain homogeneous generators. The original work of Michael Atiyah and Raoul Bott concerned the integral cohomology ring of $\operatorname{Bun}_G(X)$.

== See also ==
- Borel's theorem, which says that the cohomology ring of a classifying stack is a polynomial ring.
