= Stiefel–Whitney class =

Set of topological invariants

In mathematics, in particular in algebraic topology and differential geometry, the Stiefel–Whitney classes are a set of topological invariants of a real vector bundle that describe the obstructions to constructing everywhere independent sets of sections of the vector bundle. Stiefel–Whitney classes are indexed from 0 to n, where n is the rank of the vector bundle. If the Stiefel–Whitney class of index i is nonzero, then there cannot exist $(n-i+1)$ everywhere linearly independent sections of the vector bundle. A nonzero nth Stiefel–Whitney class indicates that every section of the bundle must vanish at some point. A nonzero first Stiefel–Whitney class indicates that the vector bundle is not orientable. For example, the first Stiefel–Whitney class of the Möbius strip, as a line bundle over the circle, is not zero, whereas the first Stiefel–Whitney class of the trivial line bundle over the circle, $S^1 \times\R$, is zero.

The Stiefel–Whitney class was named for Eduard Stiefel and Hassler Whitney and is an example of a $\Z/2\Z$-characteristic class associated to real vector bundles.

In algebraic geometry one can also define analogous Stiefel–Whitney classes for vector bundles with a non-degenerate quadratic form, taking values in etale cohomology groups or in Milnor K-theory. As a special case one can define Stiefel–Whitney classes for quadratic forms over fields, the first two cases being the discriminant and the Hasse–Witt invariant (Milnor 1970).

== Introduction ==
=== General presentation ===
For a real vector bundle E, the Stiefel–Whitney class of E is denoted by w(E). It is an element of the cohomology ring

$$H^\ast(X; \Z/2\Z) = \bigoplus_{i\geq0} H^i(X; \Z/2\Z)$$

where X is the base space of the bundle E, and $\Z/2\Z$ (often alternatively denoted by $\Z_2$) is the commutative ring whose only elements are 0 and 1. The component of $w(E)$ in $H^i(X; \Z/2\Z)$ is denoted by $w_i(E)$ and called the i-th Stiefel–Whitney class of E. Thus,

$$w(E) = w_0(E) + w_1(E) + w_2(E) + \cdots$$,

where each $w_i(E)$ is an element of $H^i(X; \Z/2\Z)$.

The Stiefel–Whitney class $w(E)$ is an invariant of the real vector bundle E; i.e., when F is another real vector bundle which has the same base space X as E, and if F is isomorphic to E, then the Stiefel–Whitney classes $w(E)$ and $w(F)$ are equal. (Here isomorphic means that there exists a vector bundle isomorphism $E \to F$ which covers the identity $\mathrm{id}_X\colon X\to X$.) While it is in general difficult to decide whether two real vector bundles E and F are isomorphic, the Stiefel–Whitney classes $w(E)$ and $w(F)$ can often be computed easily. If they are different, one knows that E and F are not isomorphic.

As an example, over the circle $S^1$, there is a line bundle (i.e., a real vector bundle of rank 1) that is not isomorphic to a trivial bundle. This line bundle L is the Möbius strip (which is a fiber bundle whose fibers can be equipped with vector space structures in such a way that it becomes a vector bundle). The cohomology group $H^1(S^1; \Z/2\Z)$ has just one element other than 0. This element is the first Stiefel–Whitney class $w_1(L)$ of L. Since the trivial line bundle over $S^1$ has first Stiefel–Whitney class 0, it is not isomorphic to L.

Two real vector bundles E and F which have the same Stiefel–Whitney class are not necessarily isomorphic. This happens for instance when E and F are trivial real vector bundles of different ranks over the same base space X. It can also happen when E and F have the same rank: the tangent bundle of the 2-sphere $S^2$ and the trivial real vector bundle of rank 2 over $S^2$ have the same Stiefel–Whitney class, but they are not isomorphic. But if two real line bundles over X have the same Stiefel–Whitney class, then they are isomorphic.

=== Origins ===
The Stiefel–Whitney classes $w_i(E)$ get their name because Eduard Stiefel and Hassler Whitney discovered them as mod-2 reductions of the obstruction classes to constructing $n-i+1$ everywhere linearly independent sections of the vector bundle E restricted to the i-skeleton of X. Here n denotes the dimension of the fibre of the vector bundle $F\to E\to X$.

To be precise, provided X is a CW-complex, Whitney defined classes $W_i(E)$ in the i-th cellular cohomology group of X with twisted coefficients. The coefficient system being the $(i-1)$-st homotopy group of the Stiefel manifold $V_{n-i+1}(F)$ of $n-i+1$ linearly independent vectors in the fibres of E. Whitney proved that $W_i(E)=0$ if and only if E, when restricted to the i-skeleton of X, has $n-i+1$ linearly-independent sections.

Since $\pi_{i-1}V_{n-i+1}(F)$ is either infinite-cyclic or isomorphic to $\Z/2\Z$, there is a canonical reduction of the $W_i(E)$ classes to classes $w_i(E) \in H^i(X; \Z/2\Z)$ which are the Stiefel–Whitney classes. Moreover, whenever $\pi_{i-1}V_{n-i+1}(F) = \Z/2\Z$, the two classes are identical. Thus, $w_1(E) = 0$ if and only if the bundle $E\to X$ is orientable.

The $w_0(E)$ class contains no information, because it is equal to 1 by definition. Its creation by Whitney was an act of creative notation, allowing the Whitney sum Formula $w(E_1 \oplus E_2) = w(E_1)w(E_2)$ to be true.

== Definitions ==
Throughout, $H^i(X; G)$ denotes singular cohomology of a space X with coefficients in the group G. The word map means always a continuous function between topological spaces.

=== Axiomatic definition ===
The Stiefel-Whitney characteristic class $w(E)\in H^*(X; \Z/2\Z)$ of a finite rank real vector bundle E on a paracompact base space X is defined as the unique class such that the following axioms are fulfilled:

1. Normalization: The Whitney class of the tautological line bundle over the real projective space $\mathbf{P}^1(\R)$ is nontrivial, i.e., $w(\gamma^1_1)= 1 + a \in H^*(\mathbf{P}^1(\R); \Z/2\Z)= (\Z/2\Z)[a]/(a^2)$.
2. Rank: $w_0(E) = 1 \in H^0(X),$ and for i above the rank of E, $w_i(E) = 0 \in H^i(X)$, that is, $w(E) \in H^{\leqslant \mathrm{rank} (E)}(X).$
3. Whitney product formula: $w(E\oplus F)= w(E) \smile w(F)$, that is, the Whitney class of a direct sum is the cup product of the summands' classes.
4. Naturality: $w(f^*E) = f^*w(E)$ for any real vector bundle $E \to X$ and map $f\colon X' \to X$, where $f^*E$ denotes the pullback vector bundle.

The uniqueness of these classes is proved for example, in section 17.2 – 17.6 in Husemoller or section 8 in Milnor and Stasheff. There are several proofs of the existence, coming from various constructions, with several different flavours, their coherence is ensured by the unicity statement.

=== Definition via infinite Grassmannians ===
==== The infinite Grassmannians and vector bundles ====
This section describes a construction using the notion of classifying space.

For any vector space V, let $Gr_n(V)$ denote the Grassmannian, the space of n-dimensional linear subspaces of V, and denote the infinite Grassmannian

$$Gr_n = Gr_n(\R^\infty)$$.

Recall that it is equipped with the tautological bundle $\gamma^n \to Gr_n,$ a rank n vector bundle that can be defined as the subbundle of the trivial bundle of fiber V whose fiber at a point $W \in Gr_n (V)$ is the subspace represented by W.

Let $f\colon X \to Gr_n$, be a continuous map to the infinite Grassmannian. Then, up to isomorphism, the bundle induced by the map f on X

$$f^*\gamma^n \in \mathrm{Vect}_n(X)$$

depends only on the homotopy class of the map [f]. The pullback operation thus gives a morphism from the set

$$[X; Gr_n]$$

of maps $X \to Gr_n$ modulo homotopy equivalence, to the set

$$\mathrm{Vect}_n(X)$$

of isomorphism classes of vector bundles of rank n over X.

(The important fact in this construction is that if X is a paracompact space, this map is a bijection. This is the reason why we call infinite Grassmannians the classifying spaces of vector bundles.)

Now, by the naturality axiom (4) above, $w_j (f^*\gamma^n)= f^* w_j (\gamma^n)$. So it suffices in principle to know the values of $w_j (\gamma^n)$ for all j. However, the cohomology ring $H^*(Gr_n, \Z_2)$ is free on specific generators $x_j\in H^j(Gr_n, \Z_2)$ arising from a standard cell decomposition, and it then turns out that these generators are in fact just given by $x_j=w_j (\gamma^n)$. Thus, for any rank-n bundle, $w_j= f^*x_j$, where f is the appropriate classifying map. This in particular provides one proof of the existence of the Stiefel–Whitney classes.

==== The case of line bundles ====
We now restrict the above construction to line bundles, ie we consider the space, $\mathrm{Vect}_1(X)$ of line bundles over X. The Grassmannian of lines $Gr_1$ is just the infinite projective space

$$\mathbf{P}^\infty(\mathbf{R}) = \mathbf{R}^\infty/\mathbf{R}^*,$$

which is doubly covered by the infinite sphere $S^{\infty}$ with antipodal points as fibres. This sphere $S^{\infty}$ is contractible, so we have

$$\begin{align}
\pi_1(\mathbf{P}^\infty(\mathbf{R})) &= \mathbf{Z}/2\mathbf{Z} \\
\pi_i(\mathbf{P}^\infty(\mathbf{R})) &= \pi_i(S^\infty) = 0 && i > 1
\end{align}$$

Hence P^{∞}(R) is the Eilenberg-Maclane space $K(\Z/2\Z, 1)$.

It is a property of Eilenberg-Maclane spaces, that

$$[X; \mathbf{P}^\infty(\mathbf{R}) ] = H^1(X; \Z/2\Z)$$

for any X, with the isomorphism given by f → f*η, where η is the generator of

$$H^1(\mathbf{P}^\infty(\mathbf{R}); \mathbf{Z}/2\mathbf{Z}) = \Z/2\Z$$.

Applying the former remark that α : [X, Gr_{1}] → Vect_{1}(X) is also a bijection, we obtain a bijection

$$w_1\colon \text{Vect}_1(X) \to H^1(X; \mathbf{Z}/2\mathbf{Z})$$

this defines the Stiefel–Whitney class w_{1} for line bundles.

==== The group of line bundles ====
If Vect_{1}(X) is considered as a group under the operation of tensor product, then the Stiefel–Whitney class, w_{1} : Vect_{1}(X) → H^{1}(X; Z/2Z), is an isomorphism. That is, w_{1}(λ ⊗ μ) = w_{1}(λ) + w_{1}(μ) for all line bundles λ, μ → X.

For example, since H^{1}(S^{1}; Z/2Z) = Z/2Z, there are only two line bundles over the circle up to bundle isomorphism: the trivial one, and the open Möbius strip (i.e., the Möbius strip with its boundary deleted).

The same construction for complex vector bundles shows that the Chern class defines a bijection between complex line bundles over X and H^{2}(X; Z), because the corresponding classifying space is P^{∞}(C), a K(Z, 2). This isomorphism is true for topological line bundles, the obstruction to injectivity of the Chern class for algebraic vector bundles is the Jacobian variety.

== Properties ==
=== Topological interpretation of vanishing ===
1. w_{i}(E) = 0 whenever i > rank(E).
2. If E^{k} has $s_1,\ldots,s_{\ell}$ sections which are everywhere linearly independent then the $\ell$ top degree Whitney classes vanish: $w_{k-\ell+1}=\cdots=w_k=0$.
3. The first Stiefel–Whitney class is zero if and only if the bundle is orientable. In particular, a manifold M is orientable if and only if w_{1}(TM) = 0.
4. The bundle admits a spin structure if and only if both the first and second Stiefel–Whitney classes are zero.
5. For an orientable bundle, the second Stiefel–Whitney class is in the image of the natural map H^{2}(M, Z) → H^{2}(M, Z/2Z) (equivalently, the so-called third integral Stiefel–Whitney class is zero) if and only if the bundle admits a spin^{c} structure.
6. All the Stiefel–Whitney numbers (see below) of a smooth compact manifold X vanish if and only if the manifold is the boundary of some smooth compact (unoriented) manifold (Note that some Stiefel-Whitney class could still be non-zero, even if all the Stiefel- Whitney numbers vanish!)

=== Uniqueness of the Stiefel–Whitney classes ===
The bijection above for line bundles implies that any functor θ satisfying the four axioms above is equal to w, by the following argument. The second axiom yields θ(γ^{1}) = 1 + θ_{1}(γ^{1}). For the inclusion map i : P^{1}(R) → P^{∞}(R), the pullback bundle $i^*\gamma^1$ is equal to $\gamma_1^1$. Thus the first and third axiom imply

$$i^* \theta_1 (\gamma^1 ) = \theta_1 (i^* \gamma^1 ) = \theta_1 (\gamma_1^1 ) = w_1 (\gamma_1^1 ) = w_1 (i^* \gamma^1 ) = i^* w_1 (\gamma^1 ).$$

Since the map

$$i^*: H^1  (\mathbf{P}^\infty(\mathbf{R} ); \mathbf{Z}/2\mathbf{Z}) \to H^1  (\mathbf{P}^1(\mathbf{R}); \mathbf{Z}/2\mathbf{Z} )$$

is an isomorphism, $\theta_1(\gamma^1) = w_1(\gamma^1)$ and θ(γ^{1}) = w(γ^{1}) follow. Let E be a real vector bundle of rank n over a space X. Then E admits a splitting map, i.e. a map f : X′ → X for some space X′ such that $f^*:H^*(X; \mathbf{Z}/2\mathbf{Z})) \to H^*(X'; \mathbf{Z}/2\mathbf{Z})$ is injective and $f^* E = \lambda_1 \oplus \cdots \oplus \lambda_n$ for some line bundles $\lambda_i \to X'$. Any line bundle over X is of the form $g^*\gamma^1$ for some map g, and

$$\theta (g^*\gamma^1 ) = g^*\theta ( \gamma^1 ) = g^* w ( \gamma^1 ) = w ( g^*\gamma^1 ),$$

by naturality. Thus θ = w on $\text{Vect}_1(X)$. It follows from the fourth axiom above that

$$f^*\theta(E) = \theta(f^*E) = \theta(\lambda_1 \oplus \cdots \oplus \lambda_n) = \theta(\lambda_1) \cdots \theta(\lambda_n) = w(\lambda_1) \cdots w(\lambda_n) = w(f^*E) = f^* w(E).$$

Since $f^*$ is injective, θ = w. Thus the Stiefel–Whitney class is the unique functor satisfying the four axioms above.

=== Non-isomorphic bundles with the same Stiefel–Whitney classes ===
Although the map $w_1 \colon \mathrm{Vect}_1(X) \to H^1(X; \Z/2\Z)$ is a bijection, the corresponding map is not necessarily injective in higher dimensions. For example, consider the tangent bundle $TS^n$. With the canonical embedding of $S^n$ in $\R^{n+1}$, the normal bundle $\nu$ to $S^n$ is a line bundle. Since $S^n$ is orientable, $\nu$ is trivial. The sum $TS^n \oplus \nu$ is just the restriction of $T\R^{n+1}$ to $S^n$, which is trivial since $\R^{n+1}$ is contractible. Hence w(TS^{n}) = w(TS^{n})w(ν) = w(TS^{n} ⊕ ν) = 1. But, provided n is even, TS^{n} → S^{n} is not trivial; $e(TS^n)[S^n] = \chi(TS^n) = 2 \ne0$ (where [S^{n}] denotes a fundamental class of S^{n} and χ the Euler characteristic), hence its Euler class $e$ must be nonzero.

== Related invariants ==
=== Stiefel–Whitney numbers ===
If we work on a manifold of dimension n, then any product of Stiefel–Whitney classes of total degree n can be paired with the Z/2Z-fundamental class of the manifold to give an element of Z/2Z, a Stiefel–Whitney number of the vector bundle. For example, if the manifold has dimension 3, there are three linearly independent Stiefel–Whitney numbers, given by $w_1^3, w_1 w_2, w_3$. In general, if the manifold has dimension n, the number of possible independent Stiefel–Whitney numbers is the number of partitions of n.

The Stiefel–Whitney numbers of the tangent bundle of a smooth manifold are called the Stiefel–Whitney numbers of the manifold. They are known to be cobordism invariants. It was proven by Lev Pontryagin that if B is a smooth compact (n+1)–dimensional manifold with boundary equal to M, then the Stiefel-Whitney numbers of M are all zero. Moreover, it was proved by René Thom that if all the Stiefel-Whitney numbers of M are zero then M can be realised as the boundary of some smooth compact manifold.

One Stiefel–Whitney number of importance in surgery theory is the de Rham invariant of a (4k+1)-dimensional manifold, $w_2w_{4k-1}.$

=== Wu classes ===
The Stiefel–Whitney classes $w_k$ are the Steenrod squares of the Wu classes $v_k$, defined by Wu Wenjun in 1947. Most simply, the total Stiefel–Whitney class is the total Steenrod square of the total Wu class: $\operatorname{Sq}(v) = w$. Wu classes are most often defined implicitly in terms of Steenrod squares, as the cohomology class representing the Steenrod squares. Let the manifold X be n dimensional. Then, for any cohomology class x of degree $n-k$,

$$v_k \cup x = \operatorname{Sq}^k(x)$$.

Or more narrowly, we can demand $\langle v_k \cup x, \mu\rangle = \langle \operatorname{Sq}^k(x), \mu \rangle$, again for cohomology classes x of degree $n-k$.

== Integral Stiefel–Whitney classes ==
The element $\beta w_i \in H^{i+1}(X;\mathbf{Z})$ is called the i + 1 integral Stiefel–Whitney class, where β is the Bockstein homomorphism, corresponding to reduction modulo 2, Z → Z/2Z:

$$\beta\colon H^i(X;\mathbf{Z}/2\mathbf{Z}) \to H^{i+1}(X;\mathbf{Z}).$$

For instance, the third integral Stiefel–Whitney class is the obstruction to a Spin^{c} structure.

=== Relations over the Steenrod algebra ===
Over the Steenrod algebra, the Stiefel–Whitney classes of a smooth manifold (defined as the Stiefel–Whitney classes of the tangent bundle) are generated by those of the form $w_{2^i}$. In particular, the Stiefel–Whitney classes satisfy the Wu formula, named for Wu Wenjun:

$$Sq^i(w_j)=\sum_{t=0}^i {j+t-i-1 \choose t} w_{i-t}w_{j+t}.$$

== See also ==
- Characteristic class for a general survey, in particular Chern class, the direct analogue for complex vector bundles
- Real projective space

== Literature ==
- Lawson, H. Blaine; Michelsohn, Marie-Louise (1990-02-21). Spin Geometry. Princeton University Press. ISBN 9780691085425.
- Dale Husemoller, Fibre Bundles, Springer-Verlag, 1994.
- May, J. Peter (1999), A Concise Course in Algebraic Topology (PDF), Chicago: University of Chicago Press
- Milnor, John Willard (1970), "Algebraic K-theory and quadratic forms", Inventiones Mathematicae, 9, With an appendix by J. Tate: 318–344, doi:10.1007/BF01425486, ISSN 0020-9910, MR 0260844, Zbl 0199.55501
