= Borel's theorem =

Theorem about cohomology rings

In topology, a branch of mathematics, Borel's theorem, due to Armand Borel (1953), says the cohomology ring of a classifying space or a classifying stack is a polynomial ring.

== See also ==
- Atiyah–Bott formula
