= Classifying topos =

In mathematics, a classifying topos for some sort of structure is a topos T such that there is a natural equivalence between geometric morphisms from a cocomplete topos E to T and the category of models for the structure in E.

== Examples ==
- The classifying topos for objects of a topos is the topos of presheaves over the opposite of the category of finite sets.
- The classifying topos for rings of a topos is the topos of presheaves over the opposite of the category of finitely presented rings.
- The classifying topos for local rings of a topos is the topos of sheaves over the opposite of the category of finitely presented rings with the Zariski topology.
- The classifying topos for linear orders with distinct largest and smallest elements of a topos is the topos of simplicial sets.
- If G is a discrete group, the classifying topos for G-torsors over a topos is the topos BG of G-sets.
- The classifying space of topological groups in homotopy theory.
