= Universal bundle =

In mathematics, the universal bundle in the theory of fiber bundles with structure group a given topological group G, is a specific bundle over a classifying space BG, such that every bundle with the given structure group G over M is a pullback by means of a continuous map M → BG.

== Existence of a universal bundle ==
=== In the CW complex category ===
When the definition of the classifying space takes place within the homotopy category of CW complexes, existence theorems for universal bundles arise from Brown's representability theorem.

=== For compact Lie groups ===
We will first prove:

Proposition. Let G be a compact Lie group. There exists a contractible space EG on which G acts freely. The projection EG → BG is a G-principal fibre bundle.

Proof. There exists an injection of G into a unitary group U(n) for n big enough. If we find EU(n) then we can take EG to be EU(n). The construction of EU(n) is given in classifying space for U(n).

The following Theorem is a corollary of the above Proposition.

Theorem. If M is a paracompact manifold and P → M is a principal G-bundle, then there exists a map f : M → BG, unique up to homotopy, such that P is isomorphic to f ^{∗}(EG), the pull-back of the G-bundle EG → BG by f.

Proof. Define $P \times_G EG$ to be the quotient of the product space $P \times EG$ by the equivalence relation $(g\cdot p, e) \sim (p, g \cdot e)$. On one hand, the pull-back of the bundle π : EG → BG by projection onto the second factor P ×_{G} EG → BG is the bundle P × EG. On the other hand, the pull-back of the principal G-bundle P → M by the projection p : P ×_{G} EG → M is also P × EG

$$\begin{array}{rcccl}
P          & \to                   & P\times EG   & \to & EG \\
\downarrow &                       & \downarrow   &     & \downarrow \pi \\
M          & \to_{\!\!\!\!\!\!\!s} & P\times_G EG & \to & BG
\end{array}$$

Since p is a fibration with contractible fibre EG, sections of p exist. To such a section s we associate the composition with the projection P ×_{G} EG → BG. The map we get is the f we were looking for.

For the uniqueness up to homotopy, notice that there exists a one-to-one correspondence between maps f : M → BG such that f ^{∗}(EG) → M is isomorphic to P → M and sections of p. We have just seen how to associate a f to a section. Inversely, assume that f is given. Let Φ : f ^{∗}(EG) → P be an isomorphism:

$$\Phi: \left \{ (x,u) \in M \times EG \ : \ f(x)=\pi(u) \right \}  \to  P$$

Now, simply define a section by

$$\begin{cases}
M \to P\times_G EG \\
x \mapsto \lbrack \Phi(x,u),u \rbrack
\end{cases}$$

Because all sections of p are homotopic, the homotopy class of f is unique.

== Use in the study of group actions ==
The total space of a universal bundle is usually written EG. These spaces are of interest in their own right, despite typically being contractible. For example, in defining the homotopy quotient or homotopy orbit space of a group action of G, in cases where the orbit space is pathological (in the sense of being a non-Hausdorff space, for example). The idea, if G acts on the space X, is to consider instead the action on Y = X × EG, and corresponding quotient. See equivariant cohomology for more detailed discussion.

If EG is contractible then X and Y are homotopy equivalent spaces. But the diagonal action on Y, i.e. where G acts on both X and EG coordinates, may be well-behaved when the action on X is not.

== Examples ==
- Classifying space for U(n)

== See also ==
- Chern class
- tautological bundle, a universal bundle for the general linear group.
