= Splitting principle =

Mathematical technique for vector bundles

In mathematics, the splitting principle is a technique used to reduce questions about vector bundles to the case of line bundles. In the theory of vector bundles, one often wishes to simplify computations, for example of Chern classes. Often computations are well understood for line bundles and for direct sums of line bundles. Then the splitting principle can be quite useful.

== Statement ==
One version of the splitting principle is captured in the following theorem. This theorem holds for complex vector bundles and cohomology with integer coefficients. It also holds for real vector bundles and cohomology with $\mathbb{Z}_2$ coefficients.

Theorem—Let $\xi\colon E\rightarrow X$ be a vector bundle of rank $n$ over a paracompact space $X$. There exists a space $Y=Fl(E)$, called the flag bundle associated to $E$, and a map $p\colon Y\rightarrow X$ such that

1. the induced cohomology homomorphism $p^*\colon H^*(X)\rightarrow H^*(Y)$ is injective, and
2. the pullback bundle $p^*\xi\colon p^*E\rightarrow Y$ breaks up as a direct sum of line bundles: $p^*(E)=L_1\oplus L_2\oplus\cdots\oplus L_n.$

In the complex case, the line bundles $L_i$ or their first characteristic classes are called Chern roots.

Another version of the splitting principle concerns real vector bundles and their complexifications:

Theorem—Let $\xi\colon E\rightarrow X$ be a real vector bundle of rank $2n$ over a paracompact space $X$. There exists a space $Y$ and a map $p\colon Y\rightarrow X$ such that

1. the induced cohomology homomorphism $p^*\colon H^*(X)\rightarrow H^*(Y)$ is injective, and
2. the pullback bundle $p^*\xi\colon p^*E\rightarrow Y$ breaks up as a direct sum of line bundles and their conjugates: $p^*(E\otimes \mathbb{C})=L_1\oplus \overline{L_1}\oplus \cdots\oplus L_n\oplus \overline{L_n}.$

== Consequences ==
The fact that $p^*\colon H^*(X)\rightarrow H^*(Y)$ is injective means that any equation which holds in $H^*(Y)$ — for example, among various Chern classes — also holds in $H^*(X)$. Often these equations are easier to understand for direct sums of line bundles than for arbitrary vector bundles. So equations should be understood in $Y$ and then pushed forward to $X$.

Since vector bundles on $X$ are used to define the K-theory group $K(X)$, $p^*\colon K(X)\rightarrow K(Y)$ is also injective for the map $p$ in the first theorem above.

Under the splitting principle, characteristic classes for complex vector bundles correspond to symmetric polynomials in the first Chern classes of complex line bundles; these are the Chern classes.

== See also ==
- Grothendieck splitting principle for holomorphic vector bundles on the complex projective line
