= Euler class =

Characteristic class of oriented, real vector bundles

In mathematics, specifically in algebraic topology, the Euler class is a characteristic class of oriented, real vector bundles. Like other characteristic classes, it measures how "twisted" the vector bundle is. In the case of the tangent bundle of a smooth manifold, it generalizes the classical notion of Euler characteristic. It is named after Leonhard Euler because of this.

Throughout this article $E$ is an oriented, real vector bundle of rank $r$ over a base space $X$.

== Formal definition ==
The Euler class $e(E)$ is an element of the integral cohomology group

$$H^r(X; \mathbf{Z}),$$

constructed as follows. An orientation of $E$ amounts to a continuous choice of generator of the cohomology

$$H^r(\mathbf{R}^{r}, \mathbf{R}^r \smallsetminus \{0\}; \mathbf{Z})\cong \tilde{H}^{r-1}(S^{r-1};\mathbf{Z})\cong \mathbf{Z}$$

of each fiber $\mathbf{R}^{r}$ relative to the complement $\mathbf{R}^r \smallsetminus \{0\}$ of zero. From the Thom isomorphism, this induces an orientation class

$$u \in H^r(E, E \smallsetminus E_0; \mathbf{Z})$$

in the cohomology of $E$ relative to the complement $E\smallsetminus E_0$ of the zero section $E_0$. The inclusions

$$(X, \emptyset) \hookrightarrow (E, \emptyset) \hookrightarrow (E, E \smallsetminus E_0),$$

where $X$ includes into $E$ as the zero section, induce maps

$$H^r(E, E \smallsetminus E_0; \mathbf{Z}) \to H^r(E; \mathbf{Z}) \to H^r(X; \mathbf{Z}).$$

The Euler class e(E) is the image of u under the composition of these maps.

== Properties ==
The Euler class satisfies these properties, which are axioms of a characteristic class:

- Functoriality: If $F \to Y$ is another oriented, real vector bundle and $f\colon Y\to X$ is continuous and covered by an orientation-preserving map $F\to E$, then $e(F) = f^*(e(E))$. In particular, $e(f^*(E)) = f^*(e(E))$.
- Whitney sum formula: If $F \to X$ is another oriented, real vector bundle, then the Euler class of their direct sum is given by $e(E \oplus F) = e(E) \smile e(F).$
- Normalization: If $E$ possesses a nowhere-zero section, then $e(E) = 0$.
- Orientation: If $\overline{E}$ is $E$ with the opposite orientation, then $e(\overline{E}) = -e(E)$.

Note that "Normalization" is a distinguishing feature of the Euler class. The Euler class obstructs the existence of a non-vanishing section in the sense that if $e(E)\neq 0$ then $E$ has no non-vanishing section.

Also unlike other characteristic classes, it is concentrated in a degree which depends on the rank of the bundle: $e(E)\in H^r(X)$. By contrast, the Stiefel Whitney classes $w_i(E)$ live in $H^i(X;\mathbb{Z}/2)$ independent of the rank of $E$. This reflects the fact that the Euler class is unstable, as discussed below.

=== Vanishing locus of generic section ===
The Euler class corresponds to the vanishing locus of a section of $E$ in the following way. Suppose that $X$ is an oriented smooth manifold of dimension $d$. Let $\sigma \colon X\to E$ be a smooth section that transversely intersects the zero section. Let $Z\subseteq X$ be the zero locus of $\sigma$. Then $Z$ is a codimension $r$ submanifold of $X$ which represents a homology class $[Z]\in H_{d-r}(X;\mathbf{Z})$ and $e(E)$ is the Poincaré dual of $[Z]$.

=== Self-intersection ===
For example, if $Y$ is a compact submanifold, then the Euler class of the normal bundle of $Y$ in $X$ is naturally identified with the self-intersection of $Y$ in $X$.

== Relations to other invariants ==
In the special case when the bundle E in question is the tangent bundle of a compact, oriented, r-dimensional manifold, the Euler class is an element of the top cohomology of the manifold, which is naturally identified with the integers by evaluating cohomology classes on the fundamental homology class. Under this identification, the Euler class of the tangent bundle equals the Euler characteristic of the manifold. In the language of characteristic numbers, the Euler characteristic is the characteristic number corresponding to the Euler class.

Thus the Euler class is a generalization of the Euler characteristic to vector bundles other than tangent bundles. In turn, the Euler class is the archetype for other characteristic classes of vector bundles, in that each "top" characteristic class equals the Euler class, as follows.

Modding out by 2 induces a map

$$H^r(X, \mathbf{Z}) \to H^r(X, \mathbf{Z}/2\mathbf{Z}).$$

The image of the Euler class under this map is the top Stiefel–Whitney class w_{r}(E). One can view this Stiefel-Whitney class as "the Euler class, ignoring orientation".

Any complex vector bundle E of complex rank d can be regarded as an oriented, real vector bundle E of real rank 2d. The Euler class of E is given by the highest dimensional Chern class $e(E)=c_d(E)\in H^{2d}(X)$

=== Squares to top Pontryagin class ===
The Pontryagin class $p_r(E)$ is defined as the Chern class of the complexification of $E$: $p_r(E)=c_{r}(\mathbf{C}\otimes E)$.

The complexification $\mathbf{C}\otimes E$ is isomorphic as an oriented bundle to $E\oplus E$. Comparing Euler classes, we see that

$$e(E) \smile e(E) = e(E \oplus E) = e(E \otimes \mathbf{C}) = c_r(E \otimes \mathbf{C}) \in H^{2r}(X, \mathbf{Z}).$$

If the rank of $E$ is odd, then $e(E) \smile e(E) = 0$. If the rank r of $E$ is even then $e(E) \smile e(E) = c_{r}(E)=p_{r/2}(E)$ where $p_{r/2}(E)$ is the top dimensional Pontryagin class of $E$.

=== Instability ===
A characteristic class $c$ is stable if $c(E\oplus \underline{R}^1)=c(E)$ where $\underline{R}^1$ is a rank one trivial bundle. Unlike most other characteristic classes, the Euler class is unstable. In fact, $e(E\oplus\underline{R}^1)=e(E)\smile e(\underline{R}^1)=0$.

The Euler class is represented by a cohomology class in the classifying space BSO(k) $e\in H^k(\mathrm{BSO}(k))$. The instability of the Euler class shows that it is not the pull-back of a class in $H^k(\mathrm{BSO}(k+1))$ under the inclusion $\mathrm{BSO}(k) \to \mathrm{BSO}(k+1)$.

This can be seen intuitively in that the Euler class is a class whose degree depends on the dimension of the bundle (or manifold, if the tangent bundle): the Euler class is an element of $H^d(X)$ where $d$ is the dimension of the bundle, while the other classes have a fixed dimension (e.g., the first Stiefel-Whitney class is an element of $H^1(X)$).

The fact that the Euler class is unstable should not be seen as a "defect": rather, it means that the Euler class "detects unstable phenomena". For instance, the tangent bundle of an even dimensional sphere is stably trivial but not trivial (the usual inclusion of the sphere $S^n\subseteq \mathrm{R}^{n+1}$ has trivial normal bundle, thus the tangent bundle of the sphere plus a trivial line bundle is the tangent bundle of Euclidean space, restricted to $S^n$, which is trivial), thus other characteristic classes all vanish for the sphere, but the Euler class does not vanish for even spheres, providing a non-trivial invariant.

== Examples ==
=== Spheres ===
The Euler characteristic of the n-sphere S^{n} is:

$$\chi(\mathbf{S}^n) = 1 + (-1)^n = \begin{cases}
2 & n\text{ even}\\
0 & n\text{ odd}.
\end{cases}$$

Thus, there is no non-vanishing section of the tangent bundle of even spheres (this is known as the hairy ball theorem). In particular, the tangent bundle of an even sphere is nontrivial—i.e., $S^{2n}$ is not a parallelizable manifold, and cannot admit a Lie group structure.

For odd spheres, S^{2n−1} ⊂ R^{2n}, a nowhere vanishing section is given by

$$(x_2,-x_1,x_4,-x_3,\dots,x_{2n},-x_{2n-1})$$

which shows that the Euler class vanishes; this is just n copies of the usual section over the circle.

As the Euler class for an even sphere corresponds to $2[S^{2n}] \in H^{2n}(S^{2n}, \mathbf{Z})$, we can use the fact that the Euler class of a Whitney sum of two bundles is just the cup product of the Euler classes of the two bundles to see that there are no other subbundles of the tangent bundle than the tangent bundle itself and the null bundle, for any even-dimensional sphere.

Since the tangent bundle of the sphere is stably trivial but not trivial, all other characteristic classes vanish on it, and the Euler class is the only ordinary cohomology class that detects non-triviality of the tangent bundle of spheres: to prove further results, one must use secondary cohomology operations or K-theory.

==== Circle ====
The cylinder is a line bundle over the circle, by the natural projection $\mathrm{R}^1 \times S^1 \to S^1$. It is a trivial line bundle, so it possesses a nowhere-zero section, and so its Euler class is 0. It is also isomorphic to the tangent bundle of the circle; the fact that its Euler class is 0 corresponds to the fact that the Euler characteristic of the circle is 0.

== See also ==
- Vandermonde polynomial
- Thom isomorphism
- Generalized Gauss–Bonnet theorem

=== Other classes ===
- Chern class
- Pontryagin class
- Stiefel–Whitney class
