= Classifying space =

Quotient of a weakly contractible space by a free action

In mathematics, specifically in homotopy theory, a classifying space BG of a topological group G is the quotient of a weakly contractible space EG (i.e., a topological space all of whose homotopy groups are trivial) by a proper free action of G. It has the property that any G principal bundle over a paracompact manifold is isomorphic to a pullback of the principal bundle $EG \to BG$. As explained later, this means that classifying spaces represent a set-valued functor on the homotopy category of topological spaces. The term classifying space can also be used for spaces that represent a set-valued functor on the category of topological spaces, such as Sierpiński space. This notion is generalized by the notion of classifying topos. However, the rest of this article discusses the more commonly used notion of classifying space up to homotopy.

For a discrete group G, BG is a path-connected topological space X such that the fundamental group of X is isomorphic to G and the higher homotopy groups of X are trivial; that is, BG is an Eilenberg–MacLane space, specifically a K(G, 1).

== Motivation ==
An example of a classifying space for the infinite cyclic group G is the circle as X. When G is a discrete group, another way to specify the condition on X is that the universal cover Y of X is contractible. In that case the projection map

$$\pi\colon Y\longrightarrow X\$$

becomes a fiber bundle with structure group G, in fact a principal bundle for G. The interest in the classifying space concept really arises from the fact that in this case Y has a universal property with respect to principal G-bundles, in the homotopy category. This is actually more basic than the condition that the higher homotopy groups vanish: the fundamental idea is, given G, to find such a contractible space Y on which G acts freely. (The weak equivalence idea of homotopy theory relates the two versions.) In the case of the circle example, what is being said is that we remark that an infinite cyclic group C acts freely on the real line R, which is contractible. Taking X as the quotient space circle, we can regard the projection π from R = Y to X as a helix in geometrical terms, undergoing projection from three dimensions to the plane. What is being claimed is that π has a universal property amongst principal C-bundles; that any principal C-bundle in a definite way 'comes from' π.

== Formalism ==
A more formal statement takes into account that G may be a topological group (not simply a discrete group), and that group actions of G are taken to be continuous; in the absence of continuous actions the classifying space concept can be dealt with, in homotopy terms, via the Eilenberg–MacLane space construction. In homotopy theory the definition of a topological space BG, the classifying space for principal G-bundles, is given, together with the space EG which is the total space of the universal bundle over BG. That is, what is provided is in fact a continuous mapping

$$\pi\colon EG\longrightarrow BG.$$

Assume that the homotopy category of CW complexes is the underlying category, from now on. The classifying property required of BG in fact relates to π. We must be able to say that given any principal G-bundle

$$\gamma\colon Y\longrightarrow Z\$$

over a space Z, there is a classifying map φ from Z to BG, such that $\gamma$ is the pullback of π along φ. In less abstract terms, the construction of $\gamma$ by 'twisting' should be reducible via φ to the twisting already expressed by the construction of π.

For this to be a useful concept, there evidently must be some reason to believe such spaces BG exist. The early work on classifying spaces introduced constructions (for example, the bar construction), that gave concrete descriptions of BG as a simplicial complex for an arbitrary discrete group. Such constructions make evident the connection with group cohomology.

Specifically, let EG be the weak simplicial complex whose n- simplices are the ordered (n+1)-tuples $[g_0,\ldots,g_n]$ of elements of G. Such an n-simplex attaches to the (n−1) simplices $[g_0,\ldots,\hat g_i,\ldots,g_n]$ in the same way a standard simplex attaches to its faces, where $\hat g_i$ means this vertex is deleted. The complex EG is contractible. The group G acts on EG by left multiplication,

$$g\cdot[g_0,\ldots,g_n ]=[gg_0,\ldots,gg_n],$$

and only the identity e takes any simplex to itself. Thus the action of G on EG is a covering space action and the quotient map $EG\to EG/G$ is the universal cover of the orbit space $BG = EG/G$, and BG is a $K(G,1)$.

In abstract terms (which are not those originally used around 1950 when the idea was first introduced) this is a question of whether a certain functor is representable: the contravariant functor from the homotopy category to the category of sets, defined by

h(Z) = set of isomorphism classes of principal G-bundles on Z.

The abstract conditions being known for this (Brown's representability theorem) ensure that the result, as an existence theorem, is affirmative and not too difficult.

== Examples ==
1. The circle $S^1$ is a classifying space for the infinite cyclic group $\Z.$ The total space is $E\Z =\R.$
2. The n-torus $\mathbb T^n$ is a classifying space for $\Z^n$, the free abelian group of rank n. The total space is $E\Z^n=\R^n.$
3. The wedge of n circles is a classifying space for the free group of rank n.
4. A closed (that is, compact and without boundary) connected surface S of genus at least 1 is a classifying space for its fundamental group $\pi_1(S).$
5. A closed (that is, compact and without boundary) connected hyperbolic manifold M is a classifying space for its fundamental group $\pi_1(M)$.
6. A finite locally connected CAT(0) cubical complex is a classifying space of its fundamental group.
7. The infinite-dimensional projective space $\mathbb{RP}^\infty$ (the direct limit of finite-dimensional projective spaces) is a classifying space for the cyclic group $\Z_2 = \Z /2\Z.$ The total space is $E\Z_2 = S^\infty$ (the direct limit of spheres $S^n.$ Alternatively, one may use Hilbert space with the origin removed; it is contractible).
8. The space $B\Z_n = S^\infty / \Z_n$ is the classifying space for the cyclic group $\Z_n.$ Here, $S^\infty$ is understood to be a certain subset of the infinite dimensional Hilbert space $\Complex^\infty$ with the origin removed; the cyclic group is considered to act on it by multiplication with roots of unity.
9. The unordered configuration space $\operatorname{UConf}_n(\R^2)$ is the classifying space of the Artin braid group $B_n$, and the ordered configuration space $\operatorname{Conf}_n(\R^2)$ is the classifying space for the pure Artin braid group $P_n.$
10. The (unordered) configuration space $\operatorname{UConf}_n(\R^\infty)$ is a classifying space for the symmetric group $S_n.$
11. The infinite dimensional complex projective space $\mathbb{CP}^\infty$ is the classifying space BS^{1} for the circle S^{1} thought of as a compact topological group.
12. The Grassmannian $Gr(n, \R^\infty)$ of n-planes in $\R^\infty$ is the classifying space of the orthogonal group O(n). The total space is $EO(n) = V(n, \R^\infty)$, the Stiefel manifold of n-dimensional orthonormal frames in $\R^\infty.$

== Applications ==
This still leaves the question of doing effective calculations with BG; for example, the theory of characteristic classes is essentially the same as computing the cohomology groups of BG, at least within the restrictive terms of homotopy theory, for interesting groups G such as Lie groups (H. Cartan's theorem). As was shown by the Bott periodicity theorem, the homotopy groups of BG are also of fundamental interest.

An example of a classifying space is that when G is cyclic of order two; then BG is real projective space of infinite dimension, corresponding to the observation that EG can be taken as the contractible space resulting from removing the origin in an infinite-dimensional Hilbert space, with G acting via v going to −v, and allowing for homotopy equivalence in choosing BG. This example shows that classifying spaces may be complicated.

In relation with differential geometry (Chern–Weil theory) and the theory of Grassmannians, a much more hands-on approach to the theory is possible for cases such as the unitary groups that are of greatest interest. The construction of the Thom complex MG showed that the spaces BG were also implicated in cobordism theory, so that they assumed a central place in geometric considerations coming out of algebraic topology. Since group cohomology can (in many cases) be defined by the use of classifying spaces, they can also be seen as foundational in much homological algebra.

Generalizations include those for classifying foliations, and the classifying toposes for logical theories of the predicate calculus in intuitionistic logic that take the place of a 'space of models'.

== See also ==
- Classifying space for O(n), BO(n)
- Classifying space for U(n), BU(n)
- Classifying space for SO(n)
- Classifying space for SU(n)
- Classifying stack
- Borel's theorem
- Equivariant cohomology
