= Cohomology ring =

Concept in algebraic topology

In mathematics, specifically algebraic topology, the cohomology ring of a topological space X is a ring formed from the cohomology groups of X together with the cup product serving as the ring multiplication. Here 'cohomology' is usually understood as singular cohomology, but the ring structure is also present in other theories such as de Rham cohomology. It is also functorial: for a continuous mapping of spaces one obtains a ring homomorphism on cohomology rings, which is contravariant.

Specifically, given a sequence of cohomology groups H^{k}(X;R) on X with coefficients in a commutative ring R (typically R is Z_{n}, Z, Q, R, or C) one can define the cup product, which takes the form

$$H^k(X;R) \times H^\ell(X;R) \to H^{k+\ell}(X; R).$$

The cup product gives a multiplication on the direct sum of the cohomology groups

$$H^\bullet(X;R) = \bigoplus_{k\in\mathbb{N}} H^k(X; R).$$

This multiplication turns H^{•}(X;R) into a ring. In fact, it is naturally an N-graded ring with the nonnegative integer k serving as the degree. The cup product respects this grading.

The cohomology ring is graded-commutative in the sense that the cup product commutes up to a sign determined by the grading. Specifically, for pure elements of degree k and ℓ; we have

$$(\alpha^k \smile \beta^\ell) = (-1)^{k\ell}(\beta^\ell \smile \alpha^k).$$

A numerical invariant derived from the cohomology ring is the cup-length, which means the maximum number of graded elements of degree ≥ 1 that when multiplied give a non-zero result. For example, a complex projective space has cup-length equal to its complex dimension.

== Examples ==
In what follows, vertical bars around an element denote its dimension in the cohomology ring.

- $\operatorname{H}^*(\mathbb{R}P^n; \mathbb{F}_2) = \mathbb{F}_2[\alpha]/(\alpha^{n+1})$ where $|\alpha|=1$.
- $\operatorname{H}^*(\mathbb{R}P^\infty; \mathbb{F}_2) = \mathbb{F}_2[\alpha]$ where $|\alpha|=1$.
- $\operatorname{H}^*(\mathbb{C}P^n; \mathbb{Z}) = \mathbb{Z}[\alpha]/(\alpha^{n+1})$ where $|\alpha|=2$.
- $\operatorname{H}^*(\mathbb{C}P^\infty; \mathbb{Z}) = \mathbb{Z}[\alpha]$ where $|\alpha|=2$.
- $\operatorname{H}^*(\mathbb{H}P^n; \mathbb{Z}) = \mathbb{Z}[\alpha]/(\alpha^{n+1})$ where $|\alpha|=4$.
- $\operatorname{H}^*(\mathbb{H}P^\infty; \mathbb{Z}) = \mathbb{Z}[\alpha]$ where $|\alpha|=4$.
- $\operatorname{H}^*(T^2;\mathbb{Z})=\Lambda_\mathbb{Z}[\alpha_1, \alpha_2]$ where $|\alpha_1|=|\alpha_2|=1$.
- $\operatorname{H}^*(T^n;\mathbb{Z})=\Lambda_\mathbb{Z}[\alpha_1,..., \alpha_n]$ where $|\alpha_i|=1$.
- $\operatorname{H}^*(S^n;\mathbb{Z})= \mathbb{Z}[\alpha]/[\alpha^2]$ where $|\alpha|=n$.
- If $K$ is the Klein bottle, $\operatorname{H}^*(K;\mathbb{Z})= \mathbb{Z}[\alpha,\beta]/[\alpha^2,2\beta,\alpha\beta,\beta^2]$ where $|\alpha|=1, |\beta|=2$.
- By the Künneth formula, the mod 2 cohomology ring of the cartesian product of n copies of $\mathbb{R}P^\infty$ is a polynomial ring in n variables with coefficients in $\mathbb{F}_2$.
- The reduced cohomology ring of wedge sums is the direct product of their reduced cohomology rings.
- The cohomology ring of suspensions vanishes except for the degree 0 part.

== See also ==
- Quantum cohomology
