= Lichnerowicz formula =

Formula for spinors

The Lichnerowicz formula (also known as the Lichnerowicz–Weitzenböck formula) is a fundamental equation in the analysis of spinors on pseudo-Riemannian manifolds. In dimension 4, it forms a piece of Seiberg–Witten theory and other aspects of gauge theory. It is named after noted mathematicians André Lichnerowicz who proved it in 1963, and Roland Weitzenböck. The formula gives a relationship between the Dirac operator and the Laplace–Beltrami operator acting on spinors, in which the scalar curvature appears in a natural way. The result is significant because it provides an interface between results from the study of elliptic partial differential equations, results concerning the scalar curvature, and results on spinors and spin structures.

Given a spin structure on a pseudo-Riemannian manifold M and a spinor bundle S, the Lichnerowicz formula states that on a section ψ of S,

$$D^2\psi = \nabla^*\nabla\psi + \frac{1}{4}\operatorname{Sc}\psi$$

where Sc denotes the scalar curvature and $\nabla^*\nabla$ is the connection Laplacian. More generally, given a complex spin structure on a pseudo-Riemannian manifold M, a spinor bundle W^{±} with section $\phi$, and a connection A on its determinant line bundle L, the Lichnerowicz formula is

$$D_{A}^{*}D_{A}\phi=\nabla _A^{*}\nabla_{A}\phi+\frac{1}{4}R\phi+\frac{1}{2}\langle F_{A}^{+},\phi\rangle.$$

Here, $D_A$ is the Dirac operator $D_A:\Gamma (W^+)\to \Gamma (W^-),$ and $\nabla _A$ is the covariant derivative associated with the connection A, $\nabla _A: \Gamma (W^+)\to \Gamma(W^+\otimes T_M^*)$. $R$ is the usual scalar curvature (a contraction of the Ricci tensor) and $F_A^+$ is the self-dual part of the curvature of A. The asterisks denote the adjoint of the quantity and the brackets $\langle , \rangle$ denote the Clifford action.

== See also ==
- Weitzenböck formula
