= Prescribed scalar curvature problem =

In Riemannian geometry, a branch of mathematics, the prescribed scalar curvature problem is as follows: given a closed, smooth manifold M and a smooth, real-valued function ƒ on M, construct a Riemannian metric on M whose scalar curvature equals ƒ. Due primarily to the work of Jerry Kazdan and Frank Wilson Warner in the 1970s, this problem is well understood.

== The solution in higher dimensions ==
If the dimension of M is three or greater, then any smooth function ƒ which takes on a negative value somewhere is the scalar curvature of some Riemannian metric. The assumption that ƒ be negative somewhere is needed in general, since not all manifolds admit metrics which have strictly positive scalar curvature. (For example, the three-dimensional torus is such a manifold.) However, Kazdan and Warner proved that if M does admit some metric with strictly positive scalar curvature, then any smooth function ƒ is the scalar curvature of some Riemannian metric.

== See also ==
- Prescribed Ricci curvature problem
- Yamabe problem
