= Griss =

Griss is a surname. Notable people with the surname include:

- George F. C. Griss (1898–1953), Dutch mathematician and philosopher
- Irmgard Griss (born 1946), Austrian lawyer and judge

== See also ==
- Gross (surname)
