= Laplace operators in differential geometry =

Elliptic differential operators in geometry mathematics

In differential geometry there are a number of second-order, linear, elliptic differential operators bearing the name Laplacian. This article provides an overview of some of them.

== Connection Laplacian ==
The connection Laplacian, also known as the rough Laplacian, is a differential operator acting on the various tensor bundles of a manifold, defined in terms of a Riemannian- or pseudo-Riemannian metric. When applied to functions (i.e. tensors of rank 0), the connection Laplacian is often called the Laplace–Beltrami operator. It is defined as the trace of the second covariant derivative:

$$\Delta T= \text{tr}\;\nabla^2 T,$$

where T is any tensor, $\nabla$ is the Levi-Civita connection associated to the metric, and the trace is taken with respect to the metric. Recall that the second covariant derivative of T is defined as

$$\nabla^2_{X,Y} T = \nabla_X \nabla_Y T - \nabla_{\nabla_X Y} T.$$

Note that with this definition, the connection Laplacian has negative spectrum. On functions, it agrees with the operator given as the divergence of the gradient.

If the connection of interest is the Levi-Civita connection one can find a convenient formula for the Laplacian of a scalar function in terms of partial derivatives with respect to a coordinate system:

$$\Delta \phi = |g|^{-1/2} \partial_\mu\left( |g|^{1/2} g^{\mu\nu} \partial_\nu\phi\right)$$

where $\phi$ is a scalar function, $|g|$ is absolute value of the determinant of the metric (absolute value is necessary in the pseudo-Riemannian case, e.g. in General Relativity) and $g^{\mu \nu}$ denotes the inverse of the metric tensor.

== Hodge Laplacian ==
The Hodge Laplacian, also known as the Laplace–de Rham operator, is a differential operator acting on differential forms. (Abstractly, it is a second order operator on each exterior power of the cotangent bundle.) This operator is defined on any manifold equipped with a Riemannian- or pseudo-Riemannian metric.

$$\Delta= \mathrm{d}\delta+\delta\mathrm{d} = (\mathrm{d}+\delta)^2,\;$$

where $\mathrm{d}$ is the exterior derivative or differential and $\delta$ is the codifferential. The Hodge Laplacian on a compact manifold has nonnegative spectrum.

The connection Laplacian may also be taken to act on differential forms by restricting it to act on skew-symmetric tensors. The connection Laplacian differs from the Hodge Laplacian by means of a Weitzenböck identity.

== Bochner Laplacian ==
The Bochner Laplacian is defined differently from the connection Laplacian, but the two will turn out to differ only by a sign, whenever the former is defined. Let M be a compact, oriented manifold equipped with a metric. Let E be a vector bundle over M equipped with a fiber metric and a compatible connection, $\nabla$. This connection gives rise to a differential operator

$$\nabla:\Gamma(E)\rightarrow \Gamma(T^*M\otimes E)$$

where $\Gamma(E)$ denotes smooth sections of E, and T^{*}M is the cotangent bundle of M. It is possible to take the $L^2$-adjoint of $\nabla$, giving a differential operator

$$\nabla^*:\Gamma(T^*M\otimes E)\rightarrow \Gamma(E).$$

The Bochner Laplacian is given by

$$\Delta=\nabla^*\nabla$$

which is a second order operator acting on sections of the vector bundle E. Note that the connection Laplacian and Bochner Laplacian differ only by a sign:

$$\nabla^* \nabla =  - \text{tr}\, \nabla^2$$

== Lichnerowicz Laplacian ==
The Lichnerowicz Laplacian is defined on symmetric tensors by taking $\nabla : \Gamma(\operatorname{Sym}^k(TM))\to \Gamma(\operatorname{Sym}^{k+1}(TM))$ to be the symmetrized covariant derivative. The Lichnerowicz Laplacian is then defined by $\Delta_L = \nabla^*\nabla$, where $\nabla^*$ is the formal adjoint. The Lichnerowicz Laplacian differs from the usual tensor Laplacian by a Weitzenböck formula involving the Riemann curvature tensor, and has natural applications in the study of Ricci flow and the prescribed Ricci curvature problem.

== Conformal Laplacian ==
On a Riemannian manifold of dimension n = 2, the Laplace–Beltrami operator acting on a smooth function φ satisfies the transformation rule

$$\tilde \Delta \varphi=e^{-2 w}\Delta \varphi$$

under the conformal change of metric $\tilde{g}=e^{2 w} g$, and the Gaussian curvature changes by

$$\tilde{K}=e^{-2w}(-\Delta w+K).$$

On a Riemannian manifold of dimension n ≥ 3, one can define the conformal Laplacian to generalize these properties. The conformal Laplacian, denoted L, acts on a smooth function φ by

$$L\varphi = -4\frac{n-1}{n-2} \Delta \varphi + R\varphi,$$

where Δ is the Laplace-Beltrami operator (of negative spectrum), and R is the scalar curvature. It satisfies the transformation rule

$$\tilde{L}(\varphi) = u^{-(n+2)/(n-2)} L(u \varphi),$$

under the conformal change of metric $\tilde g = u^{4/(n-2)} g$.

This operator often makes an appearance when studying how the scalar curvature behaves under a conformal change of a Riemannian metric. If n ≥ 3 and g is a metric and u is a smooth, positive function, then the conformal metric

$$\tilde g = u^{4/(n-2)} g$$

has scalar curvature given by

$$\tilde R = u^{-(n+2)/(n-2)} L u. \,$$

== Complex differential geometry ==
In complex differential geometry, the Laplace operator (also known as the Laplacian) is defined in terms of the complex differential forms.

$$\partial f=\sum\left(\frac{\partial f}{\partial x_k}-i\frac{\partial f}{\partial y_k}\right)dz_k$$

This operator acts on complex-valued functions of a complex variable. It is essentially the complex conjugate of the ordinary partial derivative with respect to. It's important in complex analysis and complex differential geometry for studying functions of complex variables.

== Comparisons ==
Below is a table summarizing the various Laplacian operators, including the most general vector bundle on which they act, and what structure is required for the manifold and vector bundle. All of these operators are second order, linear, and elliptic.

Laplacian	vector bundle	required structure, base manifold	required structure, vector bundle	spectrum
Hodge	differential forms	metric	induced metric and connection	positive
Connection	tensors	metric	induced metric and connection	negative
Bochner	any vector bundle	metric	fiber metric, compatible connection	positive
Lichnerowicz	symmetric 2-tensors	metric	induced connection	?
Conformal	functions	metric	none	varies

== See also ==
- Weitzenböck identity
