= Dennis DeTurck =

American mathematician (born 1954)

Dennis M. DeTurck (born July 15, 1954) is an American mathematician known for his work in partial differential equations and Riemannian geometry, in particular contributions to the theory of the Ricci flow and the prescribed Ricci curvature problem. He first used the DeTurck trick to give an alternative proof of the short time existence of the Ricci flow, which has found other uses since then.

== Education ==
DeTurck received a B.S. (1976) from Drexel University. He received an M.A. (1978) and Ph.D. (1980) in mathematics from the University of Pennsylvania. His Ph.D. supervisor was Jerry Kazdan.

== Career ==
DeTurck is currently Robert A. Fox Leadership Professor and Professor of Mathematics at the University of Pennsylvania, where he was the Dean of the College of Arts and Sciences from 2005 to 2017 and Faculty Director of Riepe College House from 2009 to 2018. In 2002, DeTurck won the Deborah and Franklin Haimo Award for Distinguished College or University Teaching of Mathematics from the Mathematical Association of America for his teaching. Despite being recognized for excellence in teaching, he has been criticized for his belief that fractions are "as obsolete as Roman numerals" and suggesting that they not be taught to younger students.

In January 2012, he shared the Chauvenet Prize with three mathematical collaborators. In 2012, he became a fellow of the American Mathematical Society.

== Selected publications ==
- DeTurck, Dennis M. (June 1981). "Existence of Metrics With Prescribed Ricci Curvature: Local Theory". Inventiones Mathematicae. 65 (2): 179–207. Bibcode:1981InMat..65..179D. doi:10.1007/BF01389010. S2CID 122644870.
- DeTurck, Dennis M. (1983). "Deforming metrics in the direction of their Ricci tensors". Journal of Differential Geometry. 18 (1): 157–162. doi:10.4310/jdg/1214509286. Archived from the original on May 30, 2019. (explains the DeTurck trick; also see the improved version)
