= Ewa Damek =

Polish mathematician

Ewa Damek (born 9 August 1958) is a Polish mathematician at the University of Wrocław whose research interests include harmonic analysis, branching processes, and Siegel domains.

== Education and career ==
Damek is a professor in the mathematical institute of the University of Wrocław, which she directed from 2002 to 2007.

She studied mathematics at the University of Wrocław beginning in 1977, and completed a doctorate under the supervision of Andrzej Hulanicki in 1987. After a stint at the University of Georgia in the US, she returned to Wrocław, where she became a full professor in 2000.

== Contributions ==
In 1992, with Fulvio Ricci, Damek published a family of counterexamples to a form of the Lichnerowicz conjecture according to which harmonic Riemannian manifolds must be locally symmetric. The asymmetric spaces they found as counterexamples are at least seven-dimensional; they are called Damek–Ricci spaces.

Damek is the coauthor, with D. Buraczewski and T. Mikosch, of the book Stochastic Models with Power Law Tails: The Equation $X=AX+B$ (Springer, 2016).

== Recognition ==
In 2011 Damek was named a knight of the Order of Polonia Restituta.
