= Valentino Tosatti =

Italian mathematician (born c.1981)

Valentino Tosatti (born c. 1981) is an Italian mathematician.

== Biography ==
Born c. 1981, in Trieste, Tosatti studied from 2000 at the Scuola Normale Superiore di Pisa and at the University of Pisa, graduating with a laurea in 2004. He then studied at Harvard University, where he graduated with an M.A. in 2005 and a Ph.D. in 2009. His Ph.D. thesis Geometry of complex Monge-Ampère equations was supervised by Shing-Tung Yau. Tosatti was from 2009 to 2012 a Joseph Fels Ritt Assistant Professor at Columbia University. At Northwestern University, he was an associate professor from 2012 to 2015 and a full professor from 2015 to 2020. From 2020 to 2022, he taught as a professor at McGill University. In 2022 he became a professor at NYU's Courant Institute of Mathematical Sciences.

Tosatti does research on complex and differential geometry; geometric analysis on complex, Hermitian, and symplectic manifolds; and partial differential equations. He is also interested in the connections of his main research topics with algebraic geometry and dynamical systems.

In 2017, with Gábor Székelyhidi and Ben Weinkove, Valentino Tosatti proved a conjecture published in 1984 by Paul Gauduchon. Acta Mathematica published their proof that on n-dimensional compact complex manifolds there is always a Gauduchon metric with prescribed volume form. For this purpose, the behavior of a large class of elliptic nonlinear partial differential equations of second order on Hermitian manifolds had to be investigated.

In 2011, Tosatti received a Blavatnik Award. In 2012, he was awarded a two-year Sloan Research Fellowship. In 2018, he received the Caccioppoli Prize. In 2019, he was elected a Fellow of the American Mathematical Society for "contributions in geometric analysis and complex geometry".

== Selected publications ==
- Tosatti, Valentino; Weinkove, Ben; Yau, Shing-Tung (2008). "Taming symplectic forms and the Calabi-Yau equation". Proceedings of the London Mathematical Society. 97 (2): 401–424. arXiv:math/0703773. doi:10.1112/plms/pdn008.
- Tosatti, Valentino (2010). "Adiabatic limits of Ricci-flat Kähler metrics". Journal of Differential Geometry. 84 (2). arXiv:0905.4718. doi:10.4310/jdg/1274707320.
- Gross, Mark; Tosatti, Valentino; Zhang, Yuguang (2013). "Collapsing of abelian fibered Calabi–Yau manifolds". Duke Mathematical Journal. 162 (3). arXiv:1108.0967. doi:10.1215/00127094-2019703.
- Tosatti, Valentino; Weinkove, Ben (2015). "On the evolution of a Hermitian metric by its Chern-Ricci form". Journal of Differential Geometry. 99. arXiv:1201.0312. doi:10.4310/jdg/1418345539.
- Tosatti, Valentino; Wang, Yu; Weinkove, Ben; Yang, Xiaokui (2015). "$C^{2,\alpha }$ estimates for nonlinear elliptic equations in complex and almost complex geometry". Calculus of Variations and Partial Differential Equations. 54: 431–453. arXiv:1402.0554. doi:10.1007/s00526-014-0791-0.
- Collins, Tristan C.; Tosatti, Valentino (2015). "Kähler currents and null loci". Inventiones Mathematicae. 202 (3): 1167–1198. arXiv:1304.5216. Bibcode:2015InMat.202.1167C. doi:10.1007/s00222-015-0585-9.
- Tosatti, Valentino; Weinkove, Ben (2016). "The Monge-Ampère equation for (𝑛-1)-plurisubharmonic functions on a compact Kähler manifold". Journal of the American Mathematical Society. 30 (2): 311–346. arXiv:1305.7511. doi:10.1090/jams/875.
- Tosatti, Valentino; Yang, Xiaokui (2017). "An extension of a theorem of Wu–Yau". Journal of Differential Geometry. 107 (3). arXiv:1506.01145. doi:10.4310/jdg/1508551226.
- Tosatti, Valentino; Weinkove, Ben; Yang, Xiaokui (2018). "The Kähler-Ricci flow, Ricci-flat metrics and collapsing limits". American Journal of Mathematics. 140 (3): 653–698. arXiv:1408.0161. doi:10.1353/ajm.2018.0016.
- Tosatti, Valentino; Weinkove, Ben (2019). "Hermitian metrics, ( n -1, n -1) forms and Monge–Ampère equations". Journal für die Reine und Angewandte Mathematik (Crelles Journal) (755): 67–101. arXiv:1310.6326. doi:10.1515/crelle-2017-0017.
