= Wiedersehen pair =

In mathematics—specifically, in Riemannian geometry—a Wiedersehen pair is a pair of distinct points x and y on a (usually, but not necessarily, two-dimensional) compact Riemannian manifold (M, g) such that every geodesic through x also passes through y, and the same with x and y interchanged.

For example, on an ordinary sphere where the geodesics are great circles, the Wiedersehen pairs are exactly the pairs of antipodal points.

If every point of an oriented manifold (M, g) belongs to a Wiedersehen pair, then (M, g) is said to be a Wiedersehen manifold. The concept was introduced by the Austro-Hungarian mathematician Wilhelm Blaschke and comes from the German term meaning "seeing again". As it turns out, in each dimension n the only Wiedersehen manifold (up to isometry) is the standard Euclidean n-sphere. Initially known as the Blaschke conjecture, this result was established by combined works of Berger, Kazdan, Weinstein (for even n), and Yang (odd n).

== See also ==
- Cut locus (Riemannian manifold)
