= André Lichnerowicz =

French mathematical physicist (1915–1998)

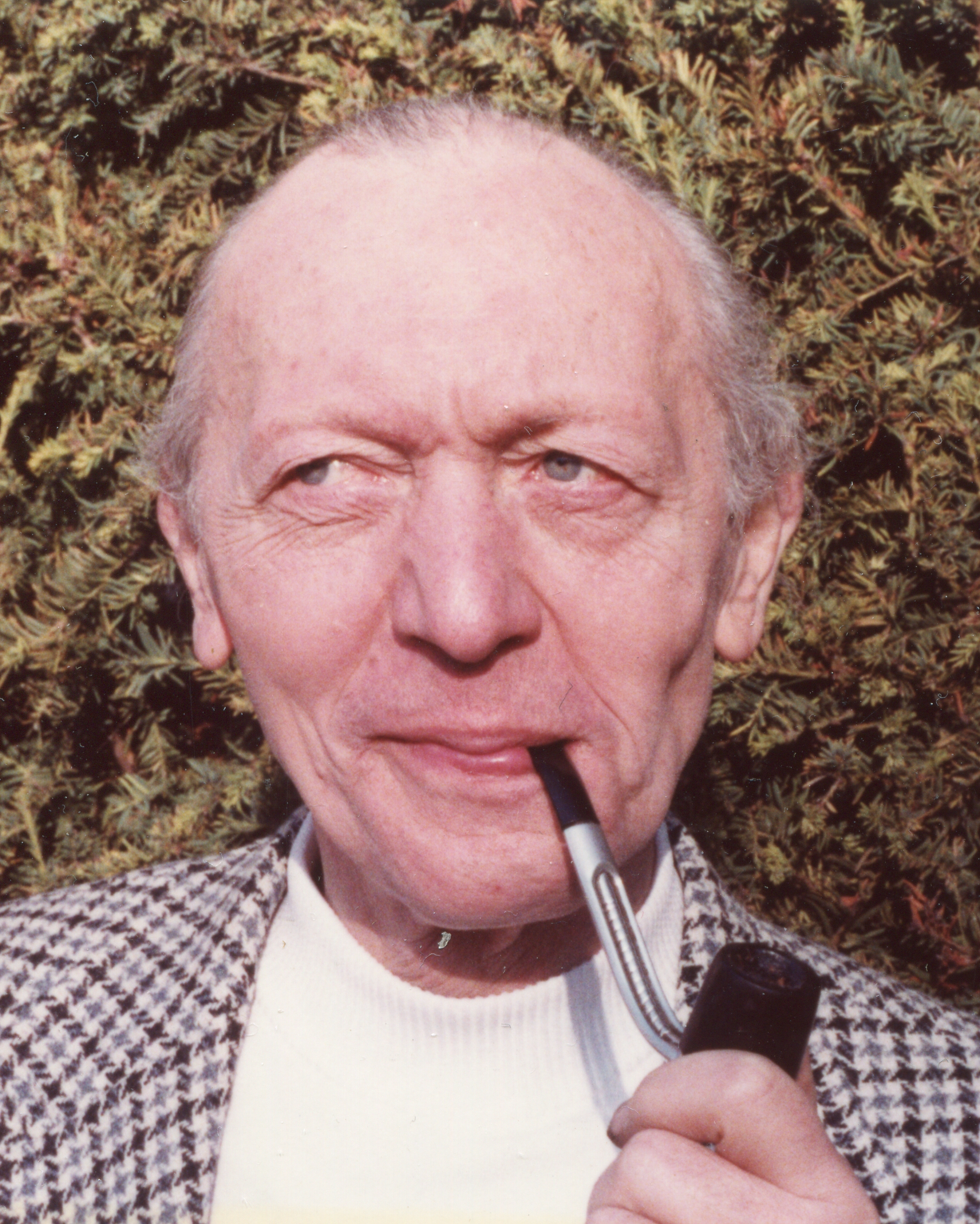
- Lichnerowicz in 1978
- Born: January 21, 1915; Bourbon l'Archambault, France
- Died: December 11, 1998 (aged 83); Paris, France
- Education: École Normale Supérieure
- Known for: Lichnerowicz conjecture Lichnerowicz Laplacian; Lichnerowicz formula Poisson manifold
- Awards: Peccot Lectures, 1944; Prix de la langue française, 1988
- Scientific career
- Fields: Mathematics
- Workplaces: University of Paris; College de France
- Thesis: Problemes Globaux en Mécanique Relativiste (1939)
- Doctoral advisor: Georges Darmois
- Doctoral students: Thierry Aubin; Claude Berge; Edmond Bonan; Marcel Berger; Yvonne Choquet-Bruhat; Raymond Couty; Paul Gauduchon; Richard Kerner; Yvette Kosmann; Ramon Lapiedra i Civera; Charles-Michel Marle; Jean-Marie Souriau; Marie-Hélène Schwartz

André Lichnerowicz (French pronunciation: [ɑ̃dʁe liʃneʁɔvits]; January 21, 1915, Bourbon-l'Archambault – December 11, 1998, Paris) was a French differential geometer and mathematical physicist. He made pioneering contributions to the theory of the scalar curvature, holonomy groups, Kähler geometry, and the mathematical study of Einstein's equations. He also made contributions to symplectic geometry, and is considered the founder of modern Poisson geometry.

== Biography ==
Lichnerowicz's grandfather Jan fought in the Polish resistance against the Prussians. Forced to flee Poland in 1860, he finally settled in France, where he married a woman from Auvergne, Justine Faure. Lichnerowicz's father, Jean, held teaching credentials (agrégation) in classics and was secretary of the Alliance française, while his mother, a descendant of paper-makers, was one of the first women to earn the agrégation in mathematics. Lichnerowicz's paternal aunt, Jeanne, was a novelist and translator known under the pseudonym Claude Dravaine.

André attended the Lycée Louis-le-Grand and then the École Normale Supérieure in Paris, gaining agrégation in 1936. After two years, he entered the Centre national de la recherche scientifique (CNRS) as one of the first researchers recruited by this institution.

Lichnerowicz studied differential geometry under Élie Cartan. His doctoral dissertation, completed in 1939 under the supervision of Georges Darmois, was entitled "Problèmes Globaux en Mécanique Relativiste" (Global problems in relativistic mechanics).

His academic career began under the cloud of Nazi occupation, during World War II. In 1941 he started teaching at the University of Strasbourg, which was moved to Clermont Ferrand and only returned to Strasbourg in 1945, after the end of the war. In November 1943 he was arrested during a raid but managed to escape. During 1944 he was invited to give a Cours Peccot at the Collège de France.

From 1949 to 1952 he held a position at the University of Paris, and in 1952 he was appointed professor at the Collège de France, where he worked until his retirement in 1986.

Lichnerowicz served as president of the Société mathématique de France during 1959. He was elected member of several national and international academies: the Accademia dei Lincei in 1962, the Académie des Sciences in 1963, the Real Academia de Ciencias in 1968, the Académie Royale de Belgique in 1975, the Pontifical Academy of Sciences in 1981, and the Accademia delle Scienze di Torino in 1984.

In 1988 he was awarded the Prix de la langue française for having illustrated the quality and the beauty of French language in his works. In 2001 he received posthumous (together with his co-authors Alain Connes and Marco Schutzenberger) the Peano Prize for his work Triangle of Thoughts.

In 2008 the André Lichnerowicz Prize was created to reward progresses in Poisson geometry, a research field where Lichnerowicz made pioneering contributions.

Lichnerowicz was a believing Catholic who served as vice-president of the Centre Catholique des Intellectuels Français.

== Research ==
In an interview in his last years, Lichnerowicz self-described his research interests as "Differential geometry and global analysis on manifolds", "the relations between mathematics and physics" and "the mathematical treatment of Einstein's theory of gravitation". Indeed, his works contributed, among others, to many areas of Riemannian geometry, symplectic geometry and general relativity.

His research in general relativity began with his PhD thesis, where he described necessary and sufficient conditions for a metric of hyperbolic signature to be a global solution of the Einstein field equations. In a series of papers in 1940 with Raymond Marrot, he provided a mathematical formulation of the relativistic kinetic theory. He later worked on gravitational radiation, spinor fields, and propagators on curved space-time, obtaining results which preluded his later works on quantisation and deformation.

Among his contributions to Riemannian geometry, in 1944 he formulated a conjecture about locally harmonic 4-manifolds, which has been later generalised and is now known as Lichnerowicz conjecture. In 1952 he showed, together with Armand Borel, that the restricted holonomy group of a Riemannian manifold is compact. He proved the now standard equivalence of the various definitions of Kähler manifold and he worked on the classification of compact homogeneous Kähler spaces. In 1958 he was one of the first to introduce a relation between the spectrum of the Laplacian and the curvature of the metric. After formalising Cartan's and Weyl's theory of spinors in a rigorous framework, he proved in 1963 the Lichnerowicz formula relating the Dirac operator and the Laplace–Beltrami operator acting on spinors. By combining this formula with the newly-proved Atiyah-Singer index theorem, he then proved the unexpected result that that many compact simply-connected spin manifolds (including the 4-manifold K3) do not admit Riemannian metrics of positive scalar curvature, thereby founding an important area of Riemannian geometry that remains active today.

In the 1970s his interests turned to symplectic geometry and dynamical systems, with many pioneering papers which, in the next decades, would give rise to the modern field of Poisson geometry. Indeed, starting in 1974, together with Moshé Flato and Daniel Sternheimer, Lichnerowicz formulated the first definitions of a Poisson manifold in terms of a bivector, the counterpart of a (symplectic) differential 2-form. He showed later that the same philosophy can be used to generalise contact structures to Jacobi manifolds. In a 1976 paper one can already find the classical formula $[df,dg]=d\{f,g\}$ for the Lie algebroid bracket of $T^*M$ on exact 1-forms via the Poisson bracket of functions. In 1977 Lichnerowicz introduced the operator defining what is now called Poisson cohomology. His 1978 papers on the deformation of the algebra of smooth functions on a Poisson manifold established the new research area of deformation quantisation.

Lichnerowicz published more than 350 papers and supervised 24 Ph.D. students. A collection of scientific contributions from several of his collaborators was published in his honour in occasion of his 60th birthday. In 1982 a personal selection of his own works was published by Hermann.

== Pedagogy of mathematics ==
While pursuing an active research career, Lichnerowicz had a deep interest in mathematics education and pedagogy. From 1963 to 1966 he was President of the International Commission on Mathematical Instruction of the International Mathematical Union. In 1967 the French government created the Lichnerowicz Commission made up of 18 teachers of mathematics. The commission recommended a curriculum based on set theory and logic with an early introduction to mathematical structures. It recommended introduction to complex numbers for seniors in high school, less computation-based instruction, and more development from premises (the axiomatic approach). These reforms have been called New Math and have been repeated internationally. However, the reforms faced stern backlash from parents, who had trouble helping their children with homework, teachers, who found themselves ill-prepared and ill-equipped, and scholars from various disciplines, who deemed the New Math to be simply unsuitable and impractical. Lichnerowicz resigned and the commission was disbanded in 1973. Nevertheless, the influence of the proposed reforms in mathematics education had endured, as the Soviet mathematician Vladimir Arnold recalled in a 1995 interview.

== Works in French ==
- Problèmes globaux en mécanique relativiste, Paris, Hermann, 1939.
- Éléments de calcul tensoriel, Armand Colin 1946, Éditions Jacques Gabay, 1987.
- Algèbre et analyse linéaires, Paris, Masson, 1947.
- Les Théories relativistes de la gravitation et de l'électromagnétisme, Paris, Masson, 1954.
- Théorie globale des connexions et des groupes d'holonomie, Rome, Cremonese, 1955.
- Géométrie des groupes de transformations, Paris, Dunod, 1958.
- Propagateurs et commutateurs en Relativité générale, Paris, PUF, 1961.

== Works in English translation ==
- Elements of Tensor Calculus, John Wiley and Sons, 1962. 2016 Dover reprint
- Relativistic Hydrodynamics and Magnetohydrodynamics, W. A. Benjamin, 1967.
- Linear Algebra and Analysis Holden Day, 1967. (Algèbre et analyse linéaires, Paris, Masson, 1947)
- Geometry of Groups of Transformations, Leyden: Noordhoff, [1958] 1976. (Géométrie des groupes de transformations, Paris, Dunod, 1958)
- Global Theory of Connection and Holonomy Groups Leyden: Noordhoff, [1955] 1976. (Théorie globale des connexions et des groupes d'holonomie, Rome, Edizioni Cremonese, 1955),
- Magnetohydrodynamics: Waves and Shock Waves in Curved Space-Time Kluwer, Springer 1994. ISBN 0-7923-2805-1
- Chaos and Determinism (with Alexandre Favre, Henri Guitton and Jean Guitton), Johns Hopkins, 1995.
- Triangle of Thoughts (with Alain Connes and Marco Schutzenberger), American Mathematical Society, 2000.

== See also ==
- Bibi-binary system
