= Jerry Kazdan =

American mathematician

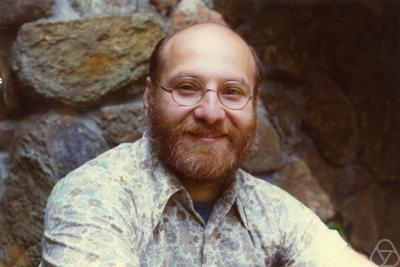
Jerry Kazdan in 1974

Jerry Lawrence Kazdan (born 31 October 1937 in Detroit, Michigan) is an American mathematician noted for his work in differential geometry and the study of partial differential equations. His contributions include the Berger–Kazdan comparison theorem, which was a key step in the proof of the Blaschke conjecture and the classification of Wiedersehen manifolds. His best-known work, done in collaboration with Frank Warner, dealt with the problem of prescribing the scalar curvature of a Riemannian metric.

== Biography ==
Kazdan received his bachelor's degree in 1959 from Rensselaer Polytechnic Institute and his master's degree in 1961 from NYU. He obtained his PhD in 1963 from the Courant Institute of Mathematical Sciences at New York University; his thesis was entitled A Boundary Value Problem Arising in the Theory of Univalent Functions and was supervised by Paul Garabedian. He then took a position as a Benjamin Peirce Instructor at Harvard University. Since 1966, he has been a Professor of Mathematics at the University of Pennsylvania.

Dennis DeTurck was a student of his.

== Honours ==
In 1999 he received the Lester Randolph Ford Award for his expository article Solving equations, an elegant legacy. In 2012 he became a fellow of the American Mathematical Society.

== Major publications ==
- DeTurck, Dennis M.; Kazdan, Jerry L. Some regularity theorems in Riemannian geometry. Ann. Sci. École Norm. Sup. (4) 14 (1981), no. 3, 249–260.
- Kazdan, Jerry L.; Warner, F.W. Curvature functions for compact 2-manifolds. Ann. of Math. (2) 99 (1974), 14–47.
- Kazdan, Jerry L.; Warner, F.W. Remarks on some quasilinear elliptic equations. Comm. Pure Appl. Math. 28 (1975), no. 5, 567–597.
- Kazdan, Jerry L.; Warner, F.W. Scalar curvature and conformal deformation of Riemannian structure. Journal of Differential Geometry 10 (1975), 113–134.
- Kazdan, Jerry L.; Warner, F.W. Existence and conformal deformation of metrics with prescribed Gaussian and scalar curvatures. Ann. of Math. (2) 101 (1975), 317–331.

== Books ==
- Lectures on Complex Numbers and Infinite Series (1966)
- Calculus Two: Linear and Nonlinear Functions (1971, with Francis J. Flanigan)
- Intermediate Calculus And Linear Algebra (1975)
- Prescribing the Curvature of a Riemannian Manifold (1985)

== See also ==
- Prescribed scalar curvature problem
