= Daniel Edwin Rutherford =

British mathematician (1906–1966)

Daniel Edwin Rutherford FRSE (4 January 1906, in Stirling – 9 November 1966, in St Andrews) was a British mathematician, known for his work on the representation theory of symmetric groups.

== Biography ==
Rutherford completed his secondary education at Perth Academy in 1924 and then, with the aid of a bursary, he went to the University of St Andrews, where he received his B.Sc. in 1927 and his M.A. in 1928 in mathematics. Upon the advice of Herbert Turnbull, Rutherford did his graduate work at the University of Amsterdam, where he wrote a doctorandus thesis under Roland Weitzenböck. Rutherford's dissertation was published in 1932 as Modular Invariants in the Cambridge Tracts. He became an assistant lecturer at the University of Edinburgh and then an assistant lecturer at the University of St Andrews, where he in 1934 was promoted to "Lecturer in Mathematics and Applied Mathematics" and given the task of building up the department in applied mathematics. At St Andrews, he received in 1949 a D.Sc. and then became in 1952 a reader and in 1964 a professor in the Gregory Chair of Applied Mathematics. His research specialty was algebra and in particular the representation theory of symmetric groups. His most famous book, Substitutional Analysis (1948), presents his research on the Young tableaux of Alfred Young. Rutherford published some research on numerical methods in fluid dynamics. He was the author of 3 books on pure mathematics and 3 books on applied mathematics and also the coauthor of a textbook on elementary abstract algebra.

In 1934 Rutherford was elected a member of the Royal Society of Edinburgh. His proposers were Herbert Turnbull, Sir Edmund Taylor Whittaker, Edward Copson and Geoffrey Timms. He won the Society's Keith Medal in 1953. In 1966 he (posthumously) won the Makdougall Brisbane Prize. He was survived by his widow and two daughters.

== Publications ==
- Modular Invariants. Cambridge Tracts in Mathematics, Number 27. 1932. reprint. NY: Stechert-Hafner. 1964; viii+84 p.
- Rutherford, D. E. (1933). "On the condition that two Zehfuss matrices be equal". Bull. Amer. Math. Soc. 39 (10): 801–808. doi:10.1090/s0002-9904-1933-05746-4. MR 1562732.
- Vector Methods. Edinburgh: Oliver and Boyd. 1939. reprint. Mineola, N.Y.: Dover. 2004. ISBN 0486439038; pbk
- Substitutional Analysis. Edinburgh University Press. 1948. reprint. Mineola, N.Y.: Dover. 2013. ISBN 9780486491202.
- Classical Mechanics. Oliver and Boyd. 1957; vii+200 p.
- Fluid Dynamics. Oliver and Boyd. 1959; 228 p.
- with E. M. Patterson: Elementary Abstract Algebra. Oliver and Boyd. 1965; vii+211 p.
- Introduction to Lattice Theory. NY: Hafner. 1968; x+177 p.
