= Richard Kerner =

French theoretical physicist

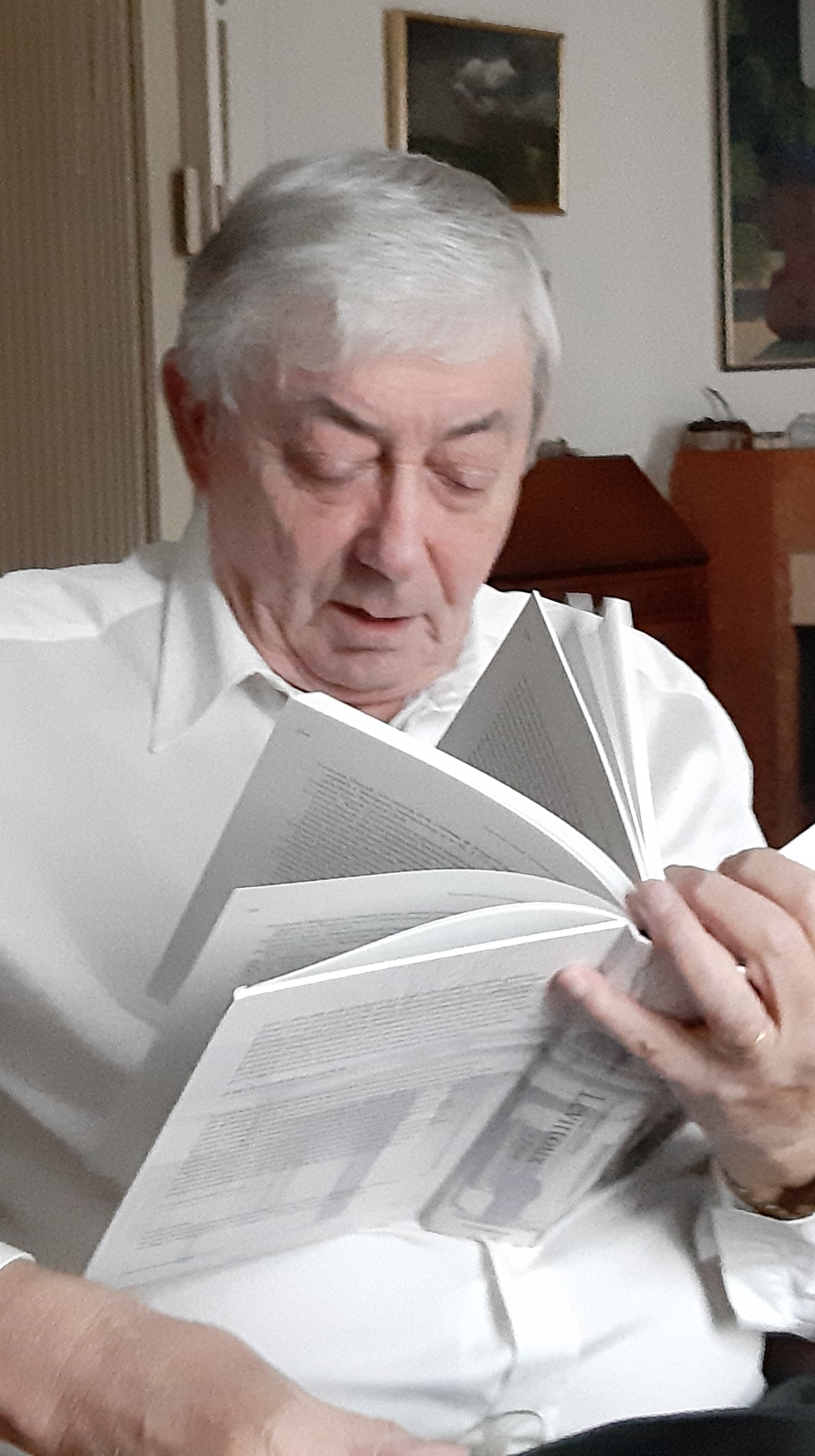
- Richard Kerner in 2010
- Born: 3 January 1943 (age 83); Soviet Union
- Education: University of Warsaw
- Awards: Alexandre-Joannidès Prize of the French Academy of Sciences (1991), Doctorate Honoris Causa, University of Tartu, Estonia (2020)
- Scientific career
- Fields: Physics and Mathematics
- Workplaces: Institute of Theoretical Physics of Warsaw University
- Doctoral advisor: Yvonne Choquet-Bruhat, André Lichnerowicz

Richard Kerner (born 3 January 1943) is a French theoretical physicist and Professor Emeritus of Pierre and Marie Curie University whose research extends into gravitation, cosmology, field theory, solid-state physics, noncommutative geometry, quantum mechanics and mathematical and theoretical biology.

== Life ==
Richard Kerner was born on 3 January 1943 in the Soviet Union. He obtained his baccalaureate at the Reytan High School (Liceum im. Tadeusza Reytana) in Warsaw. He then studied at the University of Warsaw from 1960 to 1965, obtaining his master's degree under the supervision of Andrzej Trautman. He continued his formation at the Pierre and Marie Curie University and defended his doctoral thesis in 1975 On certain applications of the Yang–Mills theory, with Yvonne Choquet-Bruhat and André Lichnerowicz as advisors.

Kerner began work as a professor and researcher at Pierre and Marie Curie University, working at the Laboratory of Relativistic Mechanics from 1969 to 1985 and the Laboratory of Elementary Particles from 1985 to 1990. In 1990 Kerner became the Director of the Laboratory of Relativistic Cosmology until 2001, switching positions to work at the Laboratory of Theoretical Physics and Condensed Matter.

Kerner was an invited researcher at the University of Utrecht in 1976, the Joseph-Louis Lagrange Institute in Turin in 1981, CERN in Geneva in 1983 and 1988, the European Laboratory for Non-Linear Spectroscopy at the University of Florence (LENS) in 2006, and the Federal University of Espírito Santo, Vitória in 2013.

Currently Kerner is the author of over 200 scientific publications, including several books on physics.

== Publications ==
- Our Celestial Clockwork, World Scientific, 2021.
- Méthodes classiques de physique théorique, Ellipses, 2014.
- Models of agglomeration and glass transition, Imperial College Press, 2006.
- Physics on manifolds, with André Lichnerowicz and Moshé Flato, Springer, 1994.
- Relativité, with Murat Boratav, Ellipses, 1991.
- Géométrie et physique, with Yvonne Choquet-Bruhat and André Lichnerowicz, Journées relativistes de Marseille-Luminy, 1985.
- Sur certaines applications de la théorie du champ de Yang et Mills, physics thesis, Université Pierre-et-Marie-Curie, 1975.
- Generalization of the Kaluza-Klein theory for an arbitrary non-abelian gauge group, Annales de l'I.H.P. Physique théorique, Tome 9 (1968) no. 2, pp. 143-152.
- Geometrical background for the unified field theories : the Einstein-Cartan theory over a principal fibre bundle, Annales de l'I.H.P. Physique théorique, Tome 34 (1981) no. 4, pp. 437-463.
- Cosmology without singularity and nonlinear gravitational Lagrangians, General Relativity and Gravitation, Volume 14, N°5 (1982) pp. 453-469.
- Noncommutative differential geometry of matrix algebras, Michel Dubois‐Violette, Richard Kerner, John Madore, Journal of Mathematical Physics Volume 31, N°2 (1990) pp. 316-322.
- Self-assembly of icosahedral viral capsids: the combinatorial analysis approach, Laboratory of Theoretical Physics and Condensed Matter at the Pierre and Marie Curie University.
- Discrete groups and internal symmetries of icosahedral viral capsids, Laboratory of Theoretical Physics and Condensed Matter at the Pierre and Marie Curie University

== See also ==
- Yang–Mills theory
- Condensed matter physics
- Special Relativity
- General Relativity
