= Bochner–Kodaira–Nakano identity =

Expression for the antiholomorphic Laplacian of a vector bundle over a hermitian manifold

In mathematics, the Bochner–Kodaira–Nakano identity is an analogue of the Weitzenböck identity for hermitian manifolds, giving an expression for the antiholomorphic Laplacian of a vector bundle over a hermitian manifold in terms of its complex conjugate and the curvature of the bundle and the torsion of the metric of the manifold. It is named after Salomon Bochner, Kunihiko Kodaira, and Shigeo Nakano.
