= Roland Weitzenböck =

Austrian mathematician

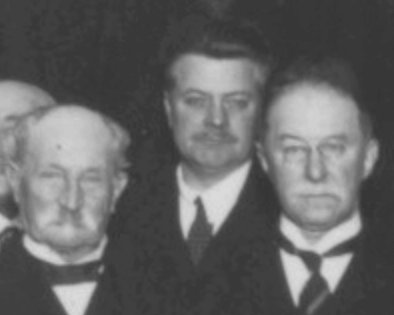
- Left to right: Diederik Korteweg, Roland Weitzenböck, Remmelt Sissingh, 1926 in Amsterdam
- Born: 26 May 1885; Kremsmünster, Austria-Hungary
- Died: 24 July 1955 (aged 70); Zelhem, Netherlands
- Education: University of Vienna
- Known for: Weitzenböck connection Weitzenböck's identity Weitzenböck's inequality Lichnerowicz–Weitzenböck formula
- Scientific career
- Fields: Mathematics
- Workplaces: University of Amsterdam
- Doctoral advisor: Wilhelm Wirtinger; Gustav Ritter von Escherich
- Doctoral students: George Griss; Max Euwe

Roland Weitzenböck (26 May 1885 – 24 July 1955) was an Austrian mathematician working on differential geometry who introduced the Weitzenböck connection. He was appointed professor of mathematics at the University of Amsterdam in 1923 at the initiative of Brouwer, after Hermann Weyl had turned down Brouwer's offer.

== Biography ==
Roland Weitzenböck was born in Kremsmünster, Austria-Hungary. He studied from 1902 to 1904 at the Imperial and Royal Technical Military Academy (now HTL Vienna) and was a captain in the Austrian army. He then studied at the University of Vienna, where he graduated in 1910 with the dissertation Zum System von 3 Strahlenkomplexen im 4-dimensionalen Raum (The system of 3-rays complexes in 4-dimensional space). After further studies at Bonn and Göttingen, he became professor at the university of Graz in 1912. After Army service in World War I, he became Professor of Mathematics at the Karl-Ferdinand University in Prague in 1918.

In 1923 Weitzenböck took a position of professor of mathematics at the University of Amsterdam, where he stayed until 1945. He settled in Blaricum, where he became a fully accepted member of the community. He was a man of few words, without observable political views. Appearances are often, however, deceptive, and in this case the solid imperturbable exterior hid a considerable amount of frustration resulting from the disastrous course of the First World War. As so many German and Austrian ex-service men, Weitzenböck became a hard-core revanchist, and an implacable enemy of France. But whereas Brouwer actively campaigned for the rehabilitation of German scientists, Weitzenböck refrained from political activity. However, after the ‘Anschluss’ of Austria in 1938, he started to vent his approval of Hitler's policies in private conversations. Weitzenböck was elected member of the Royal Netherlands Academy of Arts and Sciences (KNAW) in May 1924, but suspended in May 1945 because of his attitude during the war. Weitzenböck had been a member of the National Socialist Movement in the Netherlands.

In 1923 Weitzenböck published a modern monograph on the theory of invariants on manifolds that included tensor calculus. In the Preface of this monograph one can read an offensive acrostic. One finds that the first letter of the first word in the first 21 sentences spell out:

NIEDER MIT DEN FRANZOSEN (down with the French).

He also published papers on torsion. In fact, in his paper "Differential Invariants in Einstein’s Theory of Tele-parallelism" Weitzenböck had given a supposedly complete bibliography of papers on torsion without mentioning Élie Cartan. Weitzenböck died in Zelhem, Netherlands in 1955. His doctoral students include G. F. C. Griss, Daniel Rutherford and Max Euwe.

== Publications ==
- Komplex-Symbolik. Eine Einführung in die analytische Geometrie mehrdimensionaler Räume, Leipzig: Göschen, 1908
- Invariantentheorie, Groningen: Noordhoff, 1923
- Der vierdimensionale Raum, Die Wissenschaft, Sammlung von Einzeldarstellungen aus den Gebieten der Naturwissenschaft und der Technik... Bd. 80, Braunschweig: F. Vieweg & Sohn, 1929
- Neuere Arbeiten zur algebraischen Invariantentheorie. Differentialinvarianten. Enzyklopädie der mathematischen Wissenschaften, III, Bd.3, Teubner 1921
- Differentialinvarianten in der Einsteinschen Theorie des Fernparallelismus, Sitzungsberichte Preußische Akademie der Wissenschaften, Phys.-Math.Klasse, 1928, S.466

== See also ==
- []
