= Frank Wilson Warner =

American mathematician

Frank Wilson Warner III (born March 2 1938 in Pittsfield, Massachusetts) is an American mathematician, specializing in differential geometry.

== Education and career ==
Warner graduated in 1959 with a bachelor's degree from Pennsylvania State University and in 1963 with a Ph.D. in mathematics from the Massachusetts Institute of Technology. His thesis, written under the supervision of Isadore M. Singer, is entitled Conjugate Locus of a Riemannian Manifold. At the University of California, Berkeley, Warner was an assistant professor from 1965 to 1968. At the University of Pennsylvania, he became an associate professor in 1968 and a full professor in 1973. He was from 1995 to 1997 the deputy dean of the University of Pennsylvania School of Arts and Sciences. In 2000, he retired as professor emeritus.

In the 1970s he and Jerry Kazdan, as collaborators, made important contributions to the theory of Riemannian manifolds with prescribed scalar curvature. They proved in 1975 that any smooth function can be realized as a scalar curvature if it becomes negative somewhere on the manifold. Their further research dealt with conjugate points on Riemannian manifolds.

Warner was a Guggenheim Fellow for the academic year 1976–1977. He was elected in 1994 a Fellow of the American Association for the Advancement of Science.

== Selected publications ==
=== Articles ===
- Warner, Frank W. (1965). "The Conjugate Locus of a Riemannian Manifold". American Journal of Mathematics. 87 (3): 575–604. doi:10.2307/2373064. JSTOR 2373064.
- Warner, F. W. (1966). "Extension of the Rauch Comparison Theorem to Submanifolds". Transactions of the American Mathematical Society. 122 (2): 341–356. doi:10.2307/1994552. ISSN 0002-9947. JSTOR 1994552.
- Warner, F. W. (1967). "Conjugate Loci of Constant Order". Annals of Mathematics. 86 (1): 192–212. doi:10.2307/1970366. JSTOR 1970366.
- do Carmo, M. P.; Warner, F. W. (1970). "Rigidity and convexity of hypersurfaces in spheres". Journal of Differential Geometry. 4 (2): 133–144. doi:10.4310/jdg/1214429378. ISSN 0022-040X.
- Kazdan, Jerry L.; Warner, F. W. (1971). "Integrability conditions for $\Delta u = k - Ke^{\alpha u}$ with applications to Riemannian geometry". Bulletin of the American Mathematical Society. 77 (5): 819–824. doi:10.1090/S0002-9904-1971-12818-5.
- Kazdan, Jerry L.; Warner, Frank W. (1972). "Surfaces of revolution with monotonic increasing curvature and an application to the equation $\Delta u = 1 - Ke^{\ u}$ on $S^2$". Proceedings of the American Mathematical Society. 32: 139. doi:10.1090/S0002-9939-1972-0290309-X.
- Kazdan, Jerry L.; Warner, F. W. (1972). "Curvature functions for 2-manifolds with negative Euler characteristic". Bulletin of the American Mathematical Society. 78 (4): 570–575. doi:10.1090/S0002-9904-1972-13006-4.
- Kazdan, Jerry L.; Warner, F. W. (1973). "Curvature functions for 2-manifolds". Partial Differential Equations. Proceedings of Symposia in Pure Mathematics. Vol. 23. pp. 387–392. doi:10.1090/pspum/023/0343207. ISBN 9780821814239.
- Kazdan, Jerry L.; Warner, F. W. (1974). "Curvature Functions for Compact 2-Manifolds". Annals of Mathematics. 99 (1): 14–47. doi:10.2307/1971012. JSTOR 1971012.
- Kazdan, Jerry L.; Warner, F. W. (1974). "Curvature Functions for Open 2-Manifolds". Annals of Mathematics. 99 (2): 203–219. doi:10.2307/1970898. JSTOR 1970898.
- Kazdan, Jerry L.; Warner, F. W. (1975). "Scalar curvature and conformal deformation of Riemannian structure". Journal of Differential Geometry. 10: 113–134. doi:10.4310/jdg/1214432678.
- Kazdan, Jerry L.; Warner, F. W. (1975). "Existence and Conformal Deformation of Metrics with Prescribed Gaussian and Scalar Curvatures". Annals of Mathematics. 101 (2): 317–331. doi:10.2307/1970993. JSTOR 1970993.
- Kazdan, Jerry L.; Warner, F. W. (1975). "Remarks on some quasilinear elliptic equations". Communications on Pure and Applied Mathematics. 28 (5): 567–597. doi:10.1002/cpa.3160280502. ISSN 0010-3640.
- Gluck, Herman; Warner, Frank W. (1983). "Great circle fibrations of the three-sphere". Duke Mathematical Journal. 50: 107–132. doi:10.1215/S0012-7094-83-05003-2.

=== Books ===
- Foundations of differentiable manifolds and Lie groups (1st ed.). Scott, Foresman and Co. 1971.
- Foundations of Differentiable Manifolds and Lie Groups. Graduate Texts in Mathematics. Springer-Verlag. 1983.
  - Warner, Frank W. (1983). "Chapter 1. Manifolds". Foundations of Differentiable Manifolds and Lie Groups. Graduate Texts in Mathematics. Vol. 94. pp. 1–52. doi:10.1007/978-1-4757-1799-0_1. ISBN 978-1-4419-2820-7.
  - Warner, Frank W. (1983). "Chapter 2. Tensors and Differential Forms". Foundations of Differentiable Manifolds and Lie Groups. Graduate Texts in Mathematics. Vol. 94. pp. 53–80. doi:10.1007/978-1-4757-1799-0_2. ISBN 978-1-4419-2820-7.
  - Warner, Frank W. (1983). "Chapter 3. Lie Groups". Foundations of Differentiable Manifolds and Lie Groups. Graduate Texts in Mathematics. Vol. 94. pp. 81–136. doi:10.1007/978-1-4757-1799-0_3. ISBN 978-1-4419-2820-7.
  - Warner, Frank W. (1983). "Chapter 4. Integration on Manifolds". Foundations of Differentiable Manifolds and Lie Groups. Graduate Texts in Mathematics. Vol. 94. pp. 137–160. doi:10.1007/978-1-4757-1799-0_4. ISBN 978-1-4419-2820-7.
  - Warner, Frank W. (1983). "Chapter 5. Sheaves, Cohomology, and the de Rham Theorem". Foundations of Differentiable Manifolds and Lie Groups. Graduate Texts in Mathematics. Vol. 94. pp. 161–217. doi:10.1007/978-1-4757-1799-0_5. ISBN 978-1-4419-2820-7.
  - Warner, Frank W. (1983). "The Hodge Theorem". Chapter 6. Foundations of Differentiable Manifolds and Lie Groups. Graduate Texts in Mathematics. Vol. 94. pp. 219–258. doi:10.1007/978-1-4757-1799-0_6. ISBN 978-1-4419-2820-7.
- Warner, Frank W. (11 November 2013). Foundations of Differentiable Manifolds and Lie Groups (softcover reprint of Springer-Verlag's hardcover ed.). Springer. ISBN 9781475717990.
