= Chung Tao Yang =

Chinese-American mathematician

Chung Tao Yang, or Chung-Tao Yang, Yang Zhongdao (traditional Chinese: 楊忠道; simplified Chinese: 杨忠道; pinyin: Yáng Zhòngdào) (May 4, 1923 – 2005), was a notable Chinese American topologist. He was an academician of the Academia Sinica and served as the chair of the Department of Mathematics, University of Pennsylvania.

== Life ==
Born in Pingyang County, Wenzhou, Zhejiang Province, he graduated from Wenzhou Middle School in 1942. He graduated from Zhejiang University in 1946 and his main academic advisor was Su Buqing. From 1946 to 1948 he was an assistant in the Department of Mathematics, Zhejiang University. From 1949 to 1950 he was a lecturer at National Taiwan University. During this time he was an assistant and later a researcher in the Institute of Mathematics, Academia Sinica.

Yang went to the United States and obtained his Ph.D. from Tulane University in 1952. From 1952 to 1954, he taught at the University of Illinois, and from 1954 to 1956, he was a visiting member at the Institute for Advanced Study, where he began a lifelong collaboration with Deane Montgomery. In 1956 he became an assistant professor at the University of Pennsylvania. He was promoted to associate professor two years later and professor in 1961. He served as chair of the department from 1978 through 1983. He retired and became professor emeritus in 1991.

Yang was elected in 1968 to the Academia Sinica. From 1992 to 2004 he was an advisor for the Institute of Mathematics, Academia Sinica.

== Research ==
Yang's earliest research focused on finite projective geometry.

Yang worked mainly in differential topology (especially group actions on manifolds) and published numerous papers in this field, many in collaboration with Deane Montgomery.

His best known work was on the Blaschke conjecture. His theorem, combined with the results of others, established the conjecture for spheres.
