= Paul Gauduchon =

French mathematician

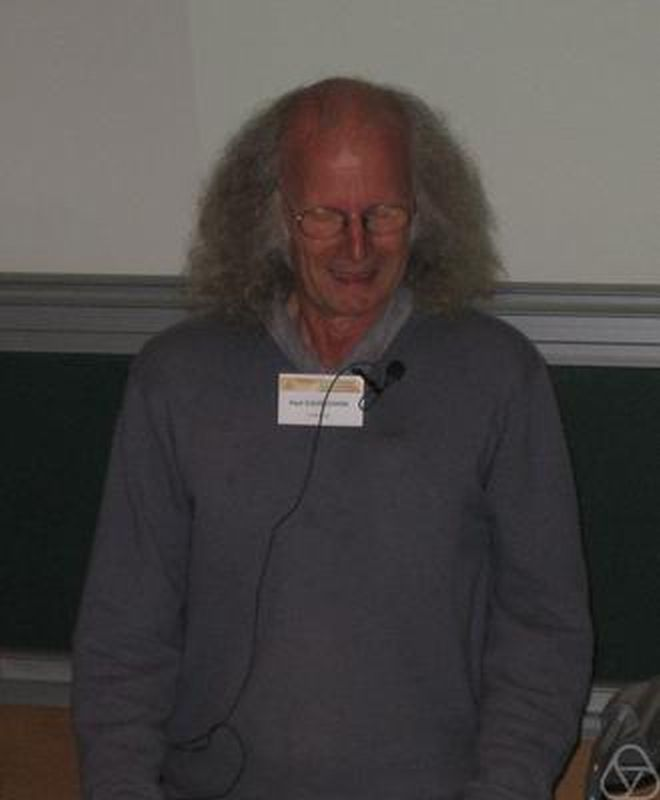
Paul Gauduchon, Bures-sur-Yvette 2007

Paul Gauduchon (born March 22, 1945) is a French mathematician, known for his work in the field of differential geometry. He is particularly known for his introduction of Gauduchon metrics in hermitian geometry. His textbook on spectral geometry, written with Marcel Berger and Edmond Mazet, is a standard reference in the field.

from 1965, Gauduchon studied at the École polytechnique and carried out research for the CNRS from 1968. In 1975, he received his doctorate (Doctor d'Etat) with André Lichnerowicz at the University of Paris VII (Sur quelques proprietes des fibers holomorphes) and completed his habilitation in 1986. Since 1990 he has been research director of the CNRS at the Center de Mathématiques of the École Polytechnique in Palaiseau Paris. There he heads the geometry group and organizes the Arthur Besse seminar on Riemannian geometry. He also teaches at the Institut des Mathematiques de Jussieu.

== Notable publications ==
- Marcel Berger, Paul Gauduchon, and Edmond Mazet. Le spectre d'une variété riemannienne. Lecture Notes in Mathematics, Vol. 194 Springer-Verlag, Berlin-New York 1971 vii+251 pp. doi:10.1007/BFb0064643
- Paul Gauduchon. La 1-forme de torsion d'une variété hermitienne compacte. Math. Ann. 267 (1984), no. 4, 495–518. doi:10.1007/BF01455968
- Paul Gauduchon. Hermitian connections and Dirac operators. Boll. Un. Mat. Ital. B (7) 11 (1997), no. 2, suppl., 257–288.
