= Lichnerowicz conjecture =

In mathematics, the Lichnerowicz conjecture is a generalization of a conjecture introduced by Lichnerowicz (1944). Lichnerowicz's original conjecture was that locally harmonic 4-manifolds are locally symmetric, and was proved by Walker (1949). The Lichnerowicz conjecture usually refers to the generalization that locally harmonic manifolds are flat or rank-1 locally symmetric. It has been proven true for compact manifolds with fundamental groups that are finite groups (Szabó 1990) but counterexamples exist in seven or more dimensions in the non-compact case (Damek & Ricci 1992)
