= Scalar curvature =

Measure of curvature in differential geometry

In the mathematical field of Riemannian geometry, the scalar curvature (or the Ricci scalar) is a measure of the curvature of a Riemannian manifold. To each point on a Riemannian manifold, it assigns a single real number determined by the geometry of the metric near that point. It is defined by a complicated explicit formula in terms of partial derivatives of the metric components, although it is also characterized by the volume of infinitesimally small geodesic balls. In the context of the differential geometry of surfaces, the scalar curvature is twice the Gaussian curvature, and completely characterizes the curvature of a surface. In higher dimensions, however, the scalar curvature only represents one particular part of the Riemann curvature tensor.

The definition of scalar curvature via partial derivatives is also valid in the more general setting of pseudo-Riemannian manifolds. This is significant in general relativity, where scalar curvature of a Lorentzian metric is one of the key terms in the Einstein field equations. Furthermore, this scalar curvature is the Lagrangian density for the Einstein–Hilbert action, the Euler–Lagrange equations of which are the Einstein field equations in vacuum.

The geometry of Riemannian metrics with positive scalar curvature has been widely studied. On noncompact spaces, this is the context of the positive mass theorem proved by Richard Schoen and Shing-Tung Yau in the 1970s, and reproved soon after by Edward Witten with different techniques. Schoen and Yau, and independently Mikhael Gromov and Blaine Lawson, developed a number of fundamental results on the topology of closed manifolds supporting metrics of positive scalar curvature. In combination with their results, Grigori Perelman's construction of Ricci flow with surgery in 2003 provided a complete characterization of these topologies in the three-dimensional case.

== Definition ==
Given a Riemannian metric g, the scalar curvature Scal is defined as the trace of the Ricci curvature tensor with respect to the metric:

$$\operatorname{Scal} = \operatorname{tr}_g \operatorname{Ric}.$$

The scalar curvature cannot be computed directly from the Ricci curvature since the latter is a (0,2)-tensor field; the metric must be used to raise an index to obtain a (1,1)-tensor field in order to take the trace. In terms of local coordinates one can write, using the Einstein notation convention, that:

$$\operatorname{Scal} = g^{ij}R_{ij}$$

where R_{ij} = Ric(∂_{i}, ∂_{j}) are the components of the Ricci tensor in the coordinate basis, and where g^{ij} are the inverse metric components, i.e. the components of the inverse of the matrix of metric components g_{ij} = g(∂_{i}, ∂_{j}). Based upon the Ricci curvature being a sum of sectional curvatures, it is possible to also express the scalar curvature as

$$\operatorname{Scal}(p)=\sum_{i\neq j}\operatorname{Sec}(e_i,e_j)$$

where Sec denotes the sectional curvature and e_{1}, ..., e_{n} is any orthonormal frame at p. By similar reasoning, the scalar curvature is twice the trace of the curvature operator. Alternatively, given the coordinate-based definition of Ricci curvature in terms of the Christoffel symbols, it is possible to express scalar curvature as

$$\operatorname{Scal} = g^{\mu \nu} \left({\Gamma^\lambda}_{\mu\nu,\lambda} - {\Gamma^\lambda}_{\mu\lambda,\nu} + {\Gamma^\sigma}_{\mu \nu}{\Gamma^\lambda}_{\lambda \sigma} - {\Gamma^\sigma}_{\mu \lambda}{\Gamma^\lambda}_{\nu \sigma}\right)$$

where ${\Gamma^\mu}_{\nu \lambda}$ are the Christoffel symbols of the metric, and ${\Gamma^\mu}_{\nu \lambda,\sigma}$ is the partial derivative of ${\Gamma^\mu}_{\nu \lambda}$ in the σ-coordinate direction.

The above definitions are equally valid for a pseudo-Riemannian metric. The special case of Lorentzian metrics is significant in the mathematical theory of general relativity, where the scalar curvature and Ricci curvature are the fundamental terms in the Einstein field equation.

However, unlike the Riemann curvature tensor or the Ricci tensor, the scalar curvature cannot be defined for an arbitrary affine connection, for the reason that the trace of a (0,2)-tensor field is ill-defined. However, there are other generalizations of scalar curvature, including in Finsler geometry.

=== Traditional notation ===
In the context of tensor index notation, it is common to use the letter R to represent three different things:

1. the Riemann curvature tensor: R_{ijk}^{l} or R_{ijkl}
2. the Ricci tensor: R_{ij}
3. the scalar curvature: R

These three are then distinguished from each other by their number of indices: the Riemann tensor has four indices, the Ricci tensor has two indices, and the Ricci scalar has zero indices. Other notations used for scalar curvature include scal, κ, K, r, s or S, and τ.

Those not using an index notation usually reserve R for the full Riemann curvature tensor. Alternatively, in a coordinate-free notation one may use Riem for the Riemann tensor, Ric for the Ricci tensor and R for the scalar curvature.

Some authors instead define Ricci curvature and scalar curvature with a normalization factor, so that

$$R_{ij}=\frac{1}{n-1}g^{kl}R_{ikjl}\text{ and }R=\frac{1}{n}g^{ij}R_{ij}.$$

The purpose of such a choice is that the Ricci and scalar curvatures become average values (rather than sums) of sectional curvatures.

== Basic properties ==
It is a fundamental fact that the scalar curvature is invariant under isometries. To be precise, if f is a diffeomorphism from a space M to a space N, the latter being equipped with a (pseudo-)Riemannian metric g, then the scalar curvature of the pullback metric on M equals the composition of the scalar curvature of g with the map f. This amounts to the assertion that the scalar curvature is geometrically well-defined, independent of any choice of coordinate chart or local frame. More generally, as may be phrased in the language of homotheties, the effect of scaling the metric by a constant factor c is to scale the scalar curvature by the inverse factor c^{−1}.

Furthermore, the scalar curvature is (up to an arbitrary choice of normalization factor) the only coordinate-independent function of the metric which, as evaluated at the center of a normal coordinate chart, is a polynomial in derivatives of the metric and has the above scaling property. This is one formulation of the Vermeil theorem.

=== Bianchi identity ===
As a direct consequence of the Bianchi identities, any (pseudo-)Riemannian metric has the property that

$$\frac{1}{2}\nabla_iR=g^{jk}\nabla_jR_{ki}.$$

This identity is called the contracted Bianchi identity. It has, as an almost immediate consequence, the Schur lemma stating that if the Ricci tensor is pointwise a multiple of the metric, then the metric must be Einstein (unless the dimension is two). Moreover, this says that (except in two dimensions) a metric is Einstein if and only if the Ricci tensor and scalar curvature are related by

$$R_{ij}=\frac{1}{n}Rg_{ij},$$

where n denotes the dimension. The contracted Bianchi identity is also fundamental in the mathematics of general relativity, since it identifies the Einstein tensor as a fundamental quantity.

=== Ricci decomposition ===
Given a (pseudo-)Riemannian metric g on a space of dimension n, the scalar curvature part of the Riemann curvature tensor is the (0,4)-tensor field

$$\frac{1}{n(n-1)}R(g_{il}g_{jk}-g_{ik}g_{jl}).$$

(This follows the convention that R_{ijkl} = g_{lp}∂_{i}Γ_{jk}^{p} − ....) This tensor is significant as part of the Ricci decomposition; it is orthogonal to the difference between the Riemann tensor and itself. The other two parts of the Ricci decomposition correspond to the components of the Ricci curvature which do not contribute to scalar curvature, and to the Weyl tensor, which is the part of the Riemann tensor which does not contribute to the Ricci curvature. Put differently, the above tensor field is the only part of the Riemann curvature tensor which contributes to the scalar curvature; the other parts are orthogonal to it and make no such contribution. There is also a Ricci decomposition for the curvature of a Kähler metric.

=== Basic formulas ===
The scalar curvature of a conformally changed metric can be computed:

$$R(e^{2f}g)=e^{-2f}\Big(R(g)-2(n-1)\Delta^gf-(n-2)(n-1)g(df,df)\Big),$$

using the convention Δ = g^{ij}∇_{i}∇_{j} for the Laplace–Beltrami operator. Alternatively,

$$R(\psi^{4/(n-2)}g)=-\frac{4\frac{n-1}{n-2}\Delta^g\psi-R(g)\psi}{\psi^{\frac{n+2}{n-2}}}.$$

Under an infinitesimal change of the underlying metric, one has

$$\frac{\partial R}{\partial t}=-\Delta^g\left(g^{ij}\frac{\partial g_{ij}}{\partial t}\right)+\left(\nabla_k\nabla_l\frac{\partial g_{ij}}{\partial t}-R_{kl}\frac{\partial g_{ij}}{\partial t}\right)g^{ik}g^{jl}.$$

This shows in particular that the principal symbol of the differential operator which sends a metric to its scalar curvature is given by

$$(\xi_i,h_{ij})\mapsto -g(\xi,\xi)g^{ij}h_{ij}+h_{ij}\xi^i\xi^j.$$

Furthermore the adjoint of the linearized scalar curvature operator is

$$f\mapsto \nabla_i\nabla_jf-(\Delta f)g_{ij}-fR_{ij},$$

and it is an overdetermined elliptic operator in the case of a Riemannian metric. It is a straightforward consequence of the first variation formulas that, to first order, a Ricci-flat Riemannian metric on a closed manifold cannot be deformed so as to have either positive or negative scalar curvature. Also to first order, an Einstein metric on a closed manifold cannot be deformed under a volume normalization so as to increase or decrease scalar curvature.

== Relation between volume and Riemannian scalar curvature ==
When the scalar curvature is positive at a point, the volume of a small geodesic ball about the point has smaller volume than a ball of the same radius in Euclidean space. On the other hand, when the scalar curvature is negative at a point, the volume of a small ball is larger than it would be in Euclidean space.

This can be made more quantitative, in order to characterize the precise value of the scalar curvature S at a point p of a Riemannian n-manifold $(M,g)$. Namely, the ratio of the n-dimensional volume of a ball of radius ε in the manifold to that of a corresponding ball in Euclidean space is given, for small ε, by

$$\frac{\operatorname{Vol}(B_\varepsilon(p) \subset M)}{\operatorname{Vol}\left(B_\varepsilon(0)\subset {\mathbb R}^n\right)} =
1 - \frac{S}{6(n + 2)}\varepsilon^2 + O\left(\varepsilon^3\right).$$

Thus, the second derivative of this ratio, evaluated at radius ε = 0, is exactly minus the scalar curvature divided by 3(n + 2).

Boundaries of these balls are (n − 1)-dimensional spheres of radius $\varepsilon$; their hypersurface measures ("areas") satisfy the following equation:

$$\frac{\operatorname{Area} (\partial B_\varepsilon(p) \subset M)}{\operatorname{Area}(\partial B_\varepsilon(0)\subset {\mathbb R}^n)} = 1 - \frac{S}{6n} \varepsilon^2 + O\left(\varepsilon^3\right).$$

These expansions generalize certain characterizations of Gaussian curvature from dimension two to higher dimensions.

== Special cases ==
=== Surfaces ===
In two dimensions, scalar curvature is exactly twice the Gaussian curvature. For an embedded surface in Euclidean space R^{3}, this means that

$$S = \frac{2}{\rho_1\rho_2}\,$$

where $\rho_1,\,\rho_2$ are the principal radii of the surface. For example, the scalar curvature of the 2-sphere of radius r is equal to 2/r^{2}.

The 2-dimensional Riemann curvature tensor has only one independent component, and it can be expressed in terms of the scalar curvature and metric area form. Namely, in any coordinate system, one has

$$2R_{1212} \,= S \det (g_{ij}) = S\left[g_{11}g_{22} - (g_{12})^2\right].$$

=== Space forms ===
A space form is by definition a Riemannian manifold with constant sectional curvature. Space forms are locally isometric to one of the following types:

Euclidean space
The Riemann tensor of an n-dimensional Euclidean space vanishes identically, so the scalar curvature does as well.
n-spheres
The sectional curvature of an n-sphere of radius r is K = 1/r^{2}. Hence the scalar curvature is S = n(n − 1)/r^{2}.
Hyperbolic space
By the hyperboloid model, an n-dimensional hyperbolic space can be identified with the subset of (n + 1)-dimensional Minkowski space

$$x_0^2 - x_1^2 - \cdots - x_n^2 = r^2,\quad x_0 > 0.$$

The parameter r is a geometrical invariant of the hyperbolic space, and the sectional curvature is K = −1/r^{2}. The scalar curvature is thus S = −n(n − 1)/r^{2}.

The scalar curvature is also constant when given a Kähler metric of constant holomorphic sectional curvature.

=== Products ===
The scalar curvature of a product M × N of Riemannian manifolds is the sum of the scalar curvatures of M and N. For example, for any smooth closed manifold M, M × S^{2} has a metric of positive scalar curvature, simply by taking the 2-sphere to be small compared to M (so that its curvature is large). This example might suggest that scalar curvature has little relation to the global geometry of a manifold. In fact, it does have some global significance, as discussed below.

In both mathematics and general relativity, warped product metrics are an important source of examples. For example, the general Robertson–Walker spacetime, important to cosmology, is the Lorentzian metric

$$-dt^2+f(t)^2 g$$

on (a, b) × M, where g is a constant-curvature Riemannian metric on a three-dimensional manifold M. The scalar curvature of the Robertson–Walker metric is given by

$$6\frac{f'(t)^2+f(t)f''(t)+k}{f(t)^2},$$

where k is the constant curvature of g.

=== Scalar-flat spaces ===
It is automatic that any Ricci-flat manifold has zero scalar curvature; the best-known spaces in this class are the Calabi–Yau manifolds. In the pseudo-Riemannian context, this also includes the Schwarzschild spacetime and Kerr spacetime.

There are metrics with zero scalar curvature but nonvanishing Ricci curvature. For example, there is a complete Riemannian metric on the tautological line bundle over real projective space, constructed as a warped product metric, which has zero scalar curvature but nonzero Ricci curvature. This may also be viewed as a rotationally symmetric Riemannian metric of zero scalar curvature on the cylinder R × S^{n}.

== Yamabe problem ==
The Yamabe problem was resolved in 1984 by the combination of results found by Hidehiko Yamabe, Neil Trudinger, Thierry Aubin, and Richard Schoen. They proved that every smooth Riemannian metric on a closed manifold can be multiplied by some smooth positive function to obtain a metric with constant scalar curvature. In other words, every Riemannian metric on a closed manifold is conformal to one with constant scalar curvature.

== Riemannian metrics of positive scalar curvature ==
For a closed Riemannian 2-manifold M, the scalar curvature has a clear relation to the topology of M, expressed by the Gauss–Bonnet theorem: the total scalar curvature of M(being equal to twice the Gaussian curvature) is equal to 4π times the Euler characteristic of M. For example, the only closed surfaces with metrics of positive scalar curvature are those with positive Euler characteristic: the sphere S^{2} and RP^{2}. Also, those two surfaces have no metrics with scalar curvature ≤ 0.

=== Nonexistence results ===
In the 1960s, André Lichnerowicz found that on a spin manifold, the difference between the square of the Dirac operator and the tensor Laplacian (as defined on spinor fields) is given exactly by one-quarter of the scalar curvature. This is a fundamental example of a Weitzenböck formula. As a consequence, if a Riemannian metric on a closed manifold has positive scalar curvature, then there can exist no harmonic spinors. It is then a consequence of the Atiyah–Singer index theorem that, for any closed spin manifold with dimension divisible by four and of positive scalar curvature, the Â genus must vanish. This is a purely topological obstruction to the existence of Riemannian metrics with positive scalar curvature.

Lichnerowicz's argument using the Dirac operator can be "twisted" by an auxiliary vector bundle, with the effect of only introducing one extra term into the Lichnerowicz formula. Then, following the same analysis as above except using the families version of the index theorem and a refined version of the Â genus known as the α-genus, Nigel Hitchin proved that in certain dimensions there are exotic spheres which do not have any Riemannian metrics of positive scalar curvature. Gromov and Lawson later extensively employed these variants of Lichnerowicz's work. One of their resulting theorems introduces the homotopy-theoretic notion of enlargeability and says that an enlargeable spin manifold cannot have a Riemannian metric of positive scalar curvature. As a corollary, a closed manifold with a Riemannian metric of nonpositive curvature, such as a torus, has no metric with positive scalar curvature. Gromov and Lawson's various results on nonexistence of Riemannian metrics with positive scalar curvature support a conjecture on the vanishing of a wide variety of topological invariants of any closed spin manifold with positive scalar curvature. This (in a precise formulation) in turn would be a special case of the strong Novikov conjecture for the fundamental group, which deals with the K-theory of C*-algebras. This in turn is a special case of the Baum–Connes conjecture for the fundamental group.

In the special case of four-dimensional manifolds, the Seiberg–Witten equations have been usefully applied to the study of scalar curvature. Similarly to Lichnerowicz's analysis, the key is an application of the maximum principle to prove that solutions to the Seiberg–Witten equations must be trivial when scalar curvature is positive. Also in analogy to Lichnerowicz's work, index theorems can guarantee the existence of nontrivial solutions of the equations. Such analysis provides new criteria for nonexistence of metrics of positive scalar curvature. Claude LeBrun pursued such ideas in a number of papers.

=== Existence results ===
By contrast to the above nonexistence results, Lawson and Yau constructed Riemannian metrics of positive scalar curvature from a wide class of nonabelian effective group actions.

Later, Schoen–Yau and Gromov–Lawson (using different techniques) proved the fundamental result that existence of Riemannian metrics of positive scalar curvature is preserved by topological surgery in codimension at least three, and in particular is preserved by the connected sum. This establishes the existence of such metrics on a wide variety of manifolds. For example, it immediately shows that the connected sum of an arbitrary number of copies of spherical space forms and generalized cylinders S^{m} × S^{n} has a Riemannian metric of positive scalar curvature. Grigori Perelman's construction of Ricci flow with surgery has, as an immediate corollary, the converse in the three-dimensional case: a closed orientable 3-manifold with a Riemannian metric of positive scalar curvature must be such a connected sum.

Based upon the surgery allowed by the Gromov–Lawson and Schoen–Yau construction, Gromov and Lawson observed that the h-cobordism theorem and analysis of the cobordism ring can be directly applied. They proved that, in dimension greater than four, any non-spin simply connected closed manifold has a Riemannian metric of positive scalar curvature. Stephan Stolz completed the existence theory for simply-connected closed manifolds in dimension greater than four, showing that as long as the α-genus is zero, then there is a Riemannian metric of positive scalar curvature.

According to these results, for closed manifolds, the existence of Riemannian metrics of positive scalar curvature is completely settled in the three-dimensional case and in the case of simply-connected manifolds of dimension greater than four.

== Kazdan and Warner's trichotomy theorem ==
The sign of the scalar curvature has a weaker relation to topology in higher dimensions. Given a smooth closed manifold M of dimension at least 3, Kazdan and Warner solved the prescribed scalar curvature problem, describing which smooth functions on M arise as the scalar curvature of some Riemannian metric on M. Namely, M must be of exactly one of the following three types:

1. Every function on M is the scalar curvature of some metric on M.
2. A function on M is the scalar curvature of some metric on M if and only if it is either identically zero or negative somewhere.
3. A function on M is the scalar curvature of some metric on M if and only if it is negative somewhere.

Thus every manifold of dimension at least 3 has a metric with negative scalar curvature, in fact of constant negative scalar curvature. Kazdan–Warner's result focuses attention on the question of which manifolds have a metric with positive scalar curvature, that being equivalent to property (1). The borderline case (2) can be described as the class of manifolds with a strongly scalar-flat metric, meaning a metric with scalar curvature zero such that M has no metric with positive scalar curvature.

Akito Futaki showed that strongly scalar-flat metrics (as defined above) are extremely special. For a simply connected Riemannian manifold M of dimension at least 5 which is strongly scalar-flat, M must be a product of Riemannian manifolds with holonomy group SU(n) (Calabi–Yau manifolds), Sp(n) (hyperkähler manifolds), or Spin(7). In particular, these metrics are Ricci-flat, not just scalar-flat. Conversely, there are examples of manifolds with these holonomy groups, such as the K3 surface, which are spin and have nonzero α-invariant, hence are strongly scalar-flat.

== See also ==
- Introduction to the mathematics of general relativity
- Yamabe invariant
- Kretschmann scalar
