= Hodge star operator =

Exterior algebraic map taking tensors from p forms to n-p forms

In mathematics, the Hodge star operator or Hodge star is a linear map defined on the exterior algebra of a finite-dimensional oriented vector space endowed with a nondegenerate symmetric bilinear form. Applying the operator to an element of the algebra produces the Hodge dual of the element. This map was introduced by W. V. D. Hodge.

For example, in an oriented 3-dimensional Euclidean space, an oriented plane can be represented by the exterior product of two basis vectors, and its Hodge dual is the normal vector given by their cross product; conversely, any vector is dual to the oriented plane perpendicular to it, endowed with a suitable bivector. Generalizing this to an $n$-dimensional vector space, the Hodge star is a one-to-one mapping of $k$-vectors to $(n-k)$-vectors; the dimensions of these spaces are the binomial coefficients $\tbinom nk = \tbinom{n}{n - k}$.

The naturality of the star operator means it can play a role in differential geometry when applied to the cotangent bundle of a pseudo-Riemannian manifold, and hence to differential k-forms. This allows the definition of the codifferential as the Hodge adjoint of the exterior derivative, leading to the Laplace–de Rham operator. This generalizes the case of 3-dimensional Euclidean space, in which divergence of a vector field may be realized as the codifferential opposite to the gradient operator, and the Laplace operator on a function is the divergence of its gradient. An important application is the Hodge decomposition of differential forms on a closed Riemannian manifold.

== Formal definition ==
Let V be an n-dimensional oriented vector space with a symmetric bilinear form $\langle \cdot,\cdot \rangle$, referred to here as an inner product. (In more general contexts such as pseudo-Riemannian manifolds and Minkowski space, the bilinear form may not be positive-definite.) This induces an inner product on k-vectors $\alpha, \beta\in \bigwedge^{\!k}V$, for $0 \le k \le n$, by defining it on simple k-vectors $\alpha = \alpha_1 \wedge \cdots \wedge \alpha_k$ and $\beta = \beta_1 \wedge \cdots \wedge \beta_k$ to equal the Gram determinant

$$\langle \alpha, \beta \rangle = \det \left( \left\langle \alpha_i, \beta_j \right\rangle  _{i,j=1}^k\right)$$

extended to $\bigwedge^{\!k}V$ through linearity.

The unit n-vector (or pseudo-scalar) $\omega\in{\textstyle\bigwedge}^{\!n}V$ is defined in terms of an oriented orthonormal basis $\{e_1,\ldots,e_n\}$ of V as:

$$\omega := \pm e_1\wedge\cdots\wedge e_n$$,

where the sign is free to be chosen and fixed as plus or minus. (Note: In the general pseudo-Riemannian case, orthonormality means $\langle e_i,e_j\rangle\in\{\delta_{ij},-\delta_{ij}\}$ for all pairs of basis vectors.)

The Hodge star operator is a linear operator on the exterior algebra of V, mapping k-vectors to $(n-k)$-vectors, for $0 \le k \le n$. It is uniquely defined in a basis-free way by the following property:

$\alpha \wedge \star\beta = \langle \alpha,\beta \rangle \,\omega$ for all k-vectors $\alpha,\beta\in {\textstyle\bigwedge}^{\!k}V.$

Dually, in the space ${\textstyle\bigwedge}^{\!n}V^*$ of n-forms (alternating n-multilinear functions on $V^n$), the dual to $\omega$ is the volume form $\det$, the function whose value on $v_1\wedge\cdots\wedge v_n$ is the determinant of the $n\times n$ matrix assembled from the column vectors of $v_j$ in $e_i$-coordinates. Applying $\det$ to the above equation, we obtain the dual property

$\det(\alpha \wedge {\star} \beta) = \langle \alpha,\beta \rangle$ for all k-vectors $\alpha,\beta\in {\textstyle\bigwedge}^{\!k}V.$

For decomposable multivectors, taking $\alpha = \alpha_1 \wedge \cdots \wedge \alpha_k$, $\beta = \beta_1 \wedge \cdots \wedge \beta_k$, we obtain ${\star}\beta = \beta_1^\star \wedge \cdots \wedge \beta_{n-k}^\star$ satisfying:

$$\det\left(\alpha_1\wedge \cdots \wedge\alpha_k\wedge\beta_1^\star\wedge \cdots \wedge\beta_{n-k}^\star\right)
\ = \ \det\left(\langle\alpha_i, \beta_j\rangle\right).$$

This allows computation of the mapping on a basis of multivectors. Writing an orthonormal basis of k-vectors as $e_I \ = \ e_{i_1}\wedge\cdots\wedge e_{i_k}$ over all subsets $I = \{i_1<\cdots<i_k\}$ of $[n]=\{1,\ldots,n\}$, the Hodge dual is the $(n-k)$-vector corresponding to the complementary set $\bar{I} = [n] \smallsetminus I = \left\{\bar \imath_1 < \cdots < \bar \imath_{n-k}\right\}$:

$$\star e_I = s\cdot t\cdot  e_\bar{I} ,$$

where $s=\pm 1$ is the sign of the permutation $i_1 \cdots i_k \bar \imath_1 \cdots \bar \imath_{n-k}$ and $t=\pm 1$ is the product $\langle e_{i_1},e_{i_1}\rangle\cdots \langle e_{i_k},e_{i_k}\rangle$. In the Riemannian case, $t=1$.

When the bilinear form is nondegenerate, the Hodge star operator takes an orthonormal basis to an orthonormal basis. In this case, it is an isometry on the exterior algebra $\bigwedge V$.

Eric Lengyel constructs the Hodge star in matrix form, starting with the above combinatorial property on a basis of the $2^n$-dimensional multivector space $\bigoplus_{0<k\leq n}\bigwedge^{\!k}V$. He defines the right complement of a basis multivector $m$ as the basis vector $\overline{m}$ such that $m \wedge \overline{m} = \omega$, extended to $\bigwedge^{\!k}V$ by linearity. The inner product on multivectors is defined by its $2^n \times 2^n$ Gram matrix G, so that $\langle a,b\rangle = a^{\!\mathrm T}G\,b$, where a and b are represented by $2^n \times 1$ column matrices. For an arbitrary multivector $\alpha$, the Hodge star is defined by applying the Gram matrix and taking the right complement:

$$\star\alpha = \overline{G\alpha}\,.$$

The Hodge dual can also be defined in the Clifford algebra $\mathrm{Cl}(V,\langle\rangle)$ with its geometric product:

$$\star \alpha = \widetilde{\alpha} I,$$

where $\widetilde m$ denotes the reverse operation which mutliplies degree $k$ multivectors by the sign $(-1)^{k(k-1)/2}$, and $I$ is the volume element (pseudoscalar) in the Clifford algebra, which projects to $\det$ in the exterior algebra. This projects to Hodge star on the exterior algebra via the associated graded ring mapping.

There is also a left version of the Hodge dual that can have per-grade sign differences compared to the right version defined above in even numbers of dimensions. When a distinction needs to be made, the right Hodge dual is denoted by a superscript star $\alpha^\bigstar$, and the left Hodge dual is denoted by a subscript star and defined as $\alpha_\bigstar = \underline{G\alpha}$, where the underline denotes the left complement satisfying $\underline{m} \wedge m = \omega$ for any basis element $m$. In the Clifford algebra, the left Hodge dual is $\alpha_\bigstar = I\widetilde{\alpha}$.

== Geometric explanation ==
The Hodge star is motivated by the correspondence between a subspace $W$ of $V$ and its orthogonal subspace (with respect to the scalar product), where each space is endowed with an orientation and a numerical scaling factor. Specifically, a non-zero decomposable k-vector $w_1\wedge\cdots\wedge w_k\in \textstyle\bigwedge^{\!k} V$ corresponds by the Plücker embedding to the subspace $W$ with oriented basis $w_1,\ldots,w_k$, endowed with a scaling factor equal to the squared k-dimensional volume of the parallelepiped spanned by this basis (equal to the Gram determinant of the matrix of scalar products $\langle w_i, w_j \rangle$). The Hodge star acting on a decomposable vector can be written as a decomposable $(n-k)$-vector:

$${\star}(w_1\wedge\cdots\wedge w_k) \,=\, u_1\wedge\cdots\wedge u_{n-k},$$

where $u_1,\ldots,u_{n-k}$ form an oriented basis of the orthogonal space $U = W^\perp\!$, i.e. $w_1,\ldots,w_k,u_1,\ldots,u_{n-k}$ is an oriented basis of $V$. Furthermore, the squared $(n-k)$-volume of the $u_i$-parallelepiped must equal the squared k-volume of the $w_i$-parallelepiped. This defines the mapping uniquely, modulo the anti-commutation relations of the exterior algebra.

A general k-vector is a linear combination of decomposable k-vectors, and the definition of Hodge star is extended to general k-vectors by requiring it to be linear.

=== Two dimensions ===
In two dimensions with the normalized Euclidean metric and orientation given by the ordering $(x,y)$, the Hodge star on k-forms is given by
$$\begin{align}
{\star} \, 1 &= dx \wedge dy \\
{\star} \, dx &= dy \\
{\star} \, dy &= -dx \\
{\star} ( dx \wedge dy ) &= 1 .
\end{align}$$

=== Three dimensions ===
A common example of the Hodge star operator is the case $n=3$, when it can be taken as the correspondence between vectors and bivectors. Specifically, for Euclidean R^{3} with the basis $dx, dy, dz$ of one-forms often used in vector calculus, one finds that
$$\begin{align}
{\star} \,dx &= dy \wedge dz \\
{\star} \,dy &= dz \wedge dx = -dx \wedge dz \\
{\star} \,dz &= dx \wedge dy.
\end{align}$$

The Hodge star relates the exterior and cross product in three dimensions:
$${\star} (\mathbf{u} \wedge \mathbf{v}) = \mathbf{u} \times \mathbf{v},
\qquad {\star} (\mathbf{u} \times \mathbf {v}) = \mathbf{u} \wedge \mathbf{v} .$$
Applied to three dimensions, the Hodge star provides an isomorphism between axial vectors and bivectors, so each axial vector a is associated with the bivector A of the orthogonal plane, and vice versa: $\mathbf{A} = {\star} \mathbf{a}, \ \ \mathbf{a} = {\star} \mathbf{A}$.

The Hodge star can also be interpreted as a form of the geometric correspondence between an axis of rotation and an infinitesimal rotation (see also: 3D rotation group § Lie algebra) around the axis, with speed equal to the length of the axis of rotation. A scalar product on a vector space $V$ gives an isomorphism $V\cong V^*\!$ identifying $V$ with its dual space, and the vector space of linear mappings $L(V,V)=\mathrm{Hom}_\R(V,V) \cong V^*\otimes V$ is isomorphic via the inner product to $V\otimes V$. Thus for $V = \mathbb{R}^3$, the star mapping $\textstyle {\star} : V\to\bigwedge^{\!2}\! V \subset V\otimes V$ takes each vector $\mathbf{v}$ to a bivector ${\star} \mathbf{v} \in V\otimes V$, which corresponds to a skew-symmetric linear operator $L_{\mathbf{v}} : V\to V$, an infinitesimal rotation, so that the macroscopic rotations around the axis $\mathbb{v}$ are given by the matrix exponential $\exp(t L_{\mathbf{v}})$. With respect to the basis $dx, dy, dz$ of $\R^3$, the tensor $dx\otimes dy$ corresponds to a coordinate matrix with 1 in the $dx$ row and $dy$ column, etc., and the wedge $dx\wedge dy \,=\, dx\otimes dy - dy\otimes dx$ is the skew-symmetric matrix $\scriptscriptstyle\left[\begin{array}{rrr} \,0\!\! & \!\!1 & \!\!\!\!0\!\!\!\!\!\! \\[-.5em] \,\!-1\!\!&\!\!0\!\!&\!\!\!\!0\!\!\!\!\!\! \\[-.5em] \,0\!\! & \!\!0\!\! & \!\!\!\!0\!\!\!\!\!\! \end{array}\!\!\!\right]$, etc. Thus, we may interpret the star operator as:
$$\mathbf{v} = a\,dx + b\,dy + c\,dz
\quad\longrightarrow \quad
{\star}{\mathbf{v}}
\ \cong\ L_{\mathbf{v}}
\ = \left[\begin{array}{rrr}
0 & c & -b \\
-c & 0 & a \\
b & -a & 0
\end{array}\right].$$
Under this correspondence, cross product of vectors corresponds to the commutator Lie bracket of linear operators: $L_{\mathbf{u}\times\mathbf{v}} = L_{\mathbf{v}} L_{\mathbf{u}} - L_{\mathbf{u}} L_{\mathbf{v}}=-\left[L_{\mathbf{u}}, L_{\mathbf{v}}\right]$.

=== Four dimensions ===
In the case $n=4$, the Hodge star acts as an endomorphism of the second exterior power (i.e. it maps 2-forms to 2-forms, since $4-2=2$). If the signature of the metric tensor is all positive, i.e. on a Riemannian manifold, then the Hodge star is an involution. If the signature is mixed, i.e., pseudo-Riemannian, then applying the operator twice will return the argument up to a sign – see § Duality below. This particular endomorphism property of 2-forms in four dimensions makes self-dual and anti-self-dual two-forms natural geometric objects to study. That is, one can describe the space of 2-forms in four dimensions with a basis that "diagonalizes" the Hodge star operator with eigenvalues $\pm 1$ (or $\pm i$, depending on the signature).

For concreteness, we discuss the Hodge star operator in Minkowski spacetime where $n=4$ with metric signature (− + + +) and coordinates $(t,x,y,z)$. The volume form is oriented as $\varepsilon_{0123} = 1$. For one-forms,
$$\begin{align}
{\star} dt &= -dx \wedge dy \wedge dz \,, \\
{\star} dx &= -dt \wedge dy \wedge dz \,, \\
{\star} dy &= -dt \wedge dz \wedge dx \,, \\
{\star} dz &= -dt \wedge dx \wedge dy \,,
\end{align}$$
while for 2-forms,
$$\begin{align}
{\star} (dt \wedge dx) &= - dy \wedge dz \,, \\
{\star} (dt \wedge dy) &= - dz \wedge dx \,, \\
{\star} (dt \wedge dz) &= - dx \wedge dy \,, \\
{\star} (dx \wedge dy) &=   dt \wedge dz \,, \\
{\star} (dz \wedge dx) &=   dt \wedge dy \,, \\
{\star} (dy \wedge dz) &=   dt \wedge dx \,.
\end{align}$$

These are summarized in the index notation as
$$\begin{align}
{\star} (dx^\mu) &= \eta^{\mu\lambda} \varepsilon_{\lambda\nu\rho\sigma} \frac{1}{3!} dx^\nu \wedge dx^\rho
\wedge dx^\sigma \,,\\
{\star} (dx^\mu \wedge dx^\nu) &= \eta^{\mu\kappa} \eta^{\nu\lambda} \varepsilon_{\kappa\lambda\rho\sigma} \frac{1}{2!} dx^\rho \wedge dx^\sigma \,.
\end{align}$$

Hodge dual of three- and four-forms can be easily deduced from the fact that, in the Lorentzian signature, ${\star}^2=1$ for odd-rank forms and ${\star}^2=-1$ for even-rank forms. One way to remember these Hodge duals is by noting that for any form $\alpha$, its Hodge dual ${\star}\alpha$ satisfies $\alpha \wedge ({\star} \alpha) = \pm dt \wedge dx \wedge dy \wedge dz$, using the negative if $\alpha$ contains $dt$ and the positive otherwise. (For (+ − − −), one puts in a minus sign only if $\alpha$ involves an odd number of the spatial forms $dx$, $dy$, and $dz$.)

Note that the combinations
$$(dx^\mu \wedge dx^\nu)^{\pm} := \frac{1}{2} \big( dx^\mu \wedge dx^\nu \mp i {\star} (dx^\mu \wedge dx^\nu) \big)$$
take $\pm i$ as the eigenvalue for Hodge star operator, i.e.,
$${\star} (dx^\mu \wedge dx^\nu)^{\pm} = \pm i (dx^\mu \wedge dx^\nu)^{\pm} ,$$
and hence deserve the name self-dual and anti-self-dual two-forms. Understanding the geometry, or kinematics, of Minkowski spacetime in self-dual and anti-self-dual sectors turns out to be insightful in both mathematical and physical perspectives, making contacts to the use of the two-spinor language in modern physics such as spinor-helicity formalism or twistor theory.

=== Conformal invariance ===
The Hodge star is conformally invariant on n-forms on a $2n$-dimensional vector space $V$, i.e. if $g$ is a metric on $V$ and $\lambda > 0$, then the induced Hodge stars
$${\star}_g, {\star}_{\lambda g} : \Lambda^n V \to \Lambda^n V$$
are the same.

=== Example: Derivatives in three dimensions ===
The combination of the ${\star}$ operator and the exterior derivative d generates the classical operators grad, curl, and div on vector fields in three-dimensional Euclidean space. This works out as follows: d takes a 0-form (a function) to a 1-form, a 1-form to a 2-form, and a 2-form to a 3-form (and takes a 3-form to zero). For a 0-form $f = f(x,y,z)$, the first case written out in components gives:
$$df = \frac{\partial f}{\partial x} \, dx + \frac{\partial f}{\partial y} \, dy + \frac{\partial f}{\partial z} \, dz.$$

The scalar product identifies 1-forms with vector fields as $dx \mapsto (1,0,0)$, etc., so that $df$ becomes $\operatorname{grad} f = \left(\frac{\partial f}{\partial x}, \frac{\partial f}{\partial y}, \frac{\partial f}{\partial z}\right)$.

In the second case, a vector field $\mathbf F = (A,B,C)$ corresponds to the 1-form $\varphi = A\,dx + B\,dy + C\,dz$, which has exterior derivative:
$$d\varphi =
\left(\frac{\partial C}{\partial y} - \frac{\partial B}{\partial z}\right) dy\wedge dz +
\left(\frac{\partial C}{\partial x} - \frac{\partial A}{\partial z}\right) dx\wedge dz +
\left({\partial B \over \partial x} - \frac{\partial A}{\partial y}\right) dx\wedge dy.$$

Applying the Hodge star gives the 1-form:
$${\star} d\varphi = \left({\partial C \over \partial y} - {\partial B \over \partial z} \right) \, dx  - \left({\partial C \over \partial x} - {\partial A \over \partial z} \right) \, dy + \left({\partial B \over \partial x} - {\partial A \over \partial y}\right) \, dz,$$
which becomes the vector field $\operatorname{curl}\mathbf{F} = \left( \frac{\partial C}{\partial y} - \frac{\partial B}{\partial z},\, -\frac{\partial C}{\partial x} + \frac{\partial A}{\partial z},\, \frac{\partial B}{\partial x} - \frac{\partial A}{\partial y} \right)$.

In the third case, $\mathbf F = (A,B,C)$ again corresponds to $\varphi = A\,dx + B\,dy + C\,dz$. Applying Hodge star, exterior derivative, and Hodge star again:
$$\begin{align}
{\star}\varphi &= A\,dy\wedge dz-B\,dx\wedge dz+C\,dx\wedge dy, \\
d{\star\varphi} &= \left(\frac{\partial A}{\partial x}+\frac{\partial B}{\partial y}+\frac{\partial C}{\partial z}\right)dx\wedge dy\wedge dz, \\
{\star} d{\star}\varphi &= \frac{\partial A}{\partial x}+\frac{\partial B}{\partial y}+\frac{\partial C}{\partial z}
= \operatorname{div}\mathbf{F}.
\end{align}$$

One advantage of this expression is that the identity $d^2=0$, which is true in all cases, has as special cases two other identities: (1) $\operatorname{curl} \operatorname{grad} f = 0$, and (2) $\operatorname{div} \operatorname{curl} \mathbf{F} = 0$. In particular, Maxwell's equations take on a particularly simple and elegant form, when expressed in terms of the exterior derivative and the Hodge star. The expression ${\star}d{\star}$ (multiplied by an appropriate power of −1) is called the codifferential; it is defined in full generality, for any dimension, further in the article below.

One can also obtain the Laplacian $\Delta f = \operatorname{div} \operatorname{grad} f$ in terms of the above operations:
$$\Delta f = {\star}d{\star}d f = \frac{\partial^2 f}{\partial x^2} + \frac{\partial^2 f}{\partial y^2} + \frac{\partial^2 f}{\partial z^2}.$$

The Laplacian can also be seen as a special case of the more general Laplace–deRham operator $\Delta = d\delta + \delta d$ where in three dimensions, $\delta = (-1)^k {\star} d{\star}$ is the codifferential for $k$-forms. Any function $f$ is a 0-form, and $\delta f = 0$ and so this reduces to the ordinary Laplacian. For the 1-form $\varphi$ above, the codifferential is $\delta = - {\star} d{\star}$ and after some straightforward calculations one obtains the Laplacian acting on $\varphi$.

== Duality ==
When the bilinear form is nondegenerate, applying the Hodge star twice leaves a k-vector unchanged up to a sign: for $\eta\in {\textstyle\bigwedge}^k V$ in an n-dimensional space V, one has

$${\star} {\star} \eta = (-1)^{k(n-k)} s\, \eta ,$$

where s is the parity of the signature of the scalar product on V, that is, the sign of the determinant of the matrix of the scalar product with respect to any basis. For example, if $n=4$ and the signature of the scalar product is either (+ − − −) or (− + + +), then $s=-1$. For Riemannian manifolds (including Euclidean spaces), we always have $s=1$.

The above identity implies that the inverse of ${\star}$ can be given as

$$\begin{align}
{\star}^{-1}: ~ {\textstyle\bigwedge}^{\!k} V &\to {\textstyle\bigwedge}^{\!n-k} V \\
\eta &\mapsto (-1)^{k(n-k)} \!s\, {\star} \eta
\end{align}$$

If n is odd, then $k(n-k)$ is even for any k, whereas if n is even then $k(n-k)$ has the parity of k. Therefore:

$${\star}^{-1} = \begin{cases} s\, {\star} & n \text{ is odd} \\ (-1)^k s\, {\star} & n \text{ is even} \end{cases}$$

where k is the degree of the element operated on.

== On manifolds ==
For an n-dimensional oriented pseudo-Riemannian manifold M, we apply the construction above to each cotangent space $\text{T}^*_p M$ and its exterior powers $\bigwedge^k\text{T}^*_p M$, and hence to the differential k-forms $\zeta\in\Omega^k(M) = \Gamma\left(\bigwedge^k\text{T}^*\!M\right)$, the global sections of the bundle $\bigwedge^k \mathrm{T}^*\! M\to M$. The Riemannian metric induces a scalar product on $\bigwedge^k \text{T}^*_p M$ at each point $p\in M$. We define the Hodge dual of a k-form $\zeta$, defining ${\star} \zeta$ as the unique (n – k)-form satisfying
$$\eta\wedge {\star} \zeta \ =\ \langle \eta, \zeta \rangle \, \omega$$
for every k-form $\eta$, where $\langle\eta,\zeta\rangle$ is a real-valued function on $M$, and the volume form $\omega$ is induced by the pseudo-Riemannian metric. Integrating this equation over $M$, the right side becomes the $L^2$ (square-integrable) scalar product on k-forms, and we obtain:
$$\int_M \eta\wedge {\star} \zeta
\ =\  \int_M  \langle\eta,\zeta\rangle\ \omega.$$

More generally, if $M$ is non-orientable, one can define the Hodge star of a k-form as an $(n-k)$-pseudo-differential form; that is, a differential form with values in the canonical line bundle.

=== Computation in index notation ===
We compute in terms of tensor index notation with respect to a (not necessarily orthonormal) basis $\left\{\frac{\partial}{\partial x_1}, \ldots, \frac{\partial}{\partial x_n}\right\}$ in a tangent space $V = T_p M$ and its dual basis $\{dx_1,\ldots,dx_n\}$ in $V^* = T^*_p M$, having the metric matrix $(g_{ij}) = \left(\left\langle \frac{\partial}{\partial x_i}, \frac{\partial}{\partial x_j}\right\rangle\right)$ and its inverse matrix $(g^{ij}) = (\langle dx^i, dx^j\rangle)$. The Hodge dual of a decomposable k-form is:
$${\star}\left(dx^{i_1} \wedge \dots \wedge dx^{i_k}\right)
\ =\
\frac{\sqrt{\left|\det [g_{ij}]\right|}}{(n-k)!} g^{i_1 j_1} \cdots g^{i_k j_k} \varepsilon_{j_1 \dots j_n} dx^{j_{k+1}} \wedge \dots \wedge dx^{j_n}.$$

Here $\varepsilon_{j_1 \dots j_n}$ is the Levi-Civita symbol with $\varepsilon_{1 \dots n} = 1$, and we implicitly take the sum over all values of the repeated indices $j_1,\ldots,j_n$. The factorial $(n-k)!$ accounts for double counting, and is not present if the summation indices are restricted so that $j_{k+1} < \dots < j_n$. The absolute value of the determinant is necessary since it may be negative, as for tangent spaces to Lorentzian manifolds.

An arbitrary differential form can be written as follows:
$$\alpha \ =\  \frac{1}{k!}\alpha_{i_1, \dots, i_k} dx^{i_1}\wedge \dots \wedge dx^{i_k}
\ =\ \sum_{i_1 < \dots < i_k} \alpha_{i_1, \dots, i_k} dx^{i_1}\wedge \dots \wedge dx^{i_k}.$$

The factorial $k!$ is again included to account for double counting when we allow non-increasing indices. We would like to define the dual of the component $\alpha_{i_1, \dots, i_k}$ so that the Hodge dual of the form is given by
$${\star}\alpha = \frac{1}{(n-k)!}({\star} \alpha)_{i_{k+1}, \dots, i_n} dx^{i_{k+1}} \wedge \dots \wedge dx^{i_n}.$$

Using the above expression for the Hodge dual of $dx^{i_1} \wedge \dots \wedge dx^{i_k}$, we find:
$$({\star} \alpha)_{j_{k+1}, \dots, j_n} = \frac{\sqrt{\left|\det [g_{ab}]\right|}}{k!} \alpha_{i_1, \dots, i_k}\,g^{i_1 j_1}\cdots g^{i_k j_k} \,\varepsilon_{j_1, \dots, j_n}\, .$$

Although one can apply this expression to any tensor $\alpha$, the result is antisymmetric, since contraction with the completely anti-symmetric Levi-Civita symbol cancels all but the totally antisymmetric part of the tensor. It is thus equivalent to antisymmetrization followed by applying the Hodge star.

The unit volume form $\omega = {\star} 1\in \bigwedge^n V^*$ is given by:
$$\omega = \sqrt{ \left| \det [g_{ij}] \right| }\;dx^1 \wedge \cdots \wedge dx^n .$$

=== Codifferential ===
The most important application of the Hodge star on manifolds is to define the codifferential $\delta$ on $k$-forms. Let
$$\delta = (-1)^{n(k + 1) + 1} s\ {\star} d {\star} = (-1)^{k}\, {\star}^{-1} d {\star}$$
where $d$ is the exterior derivative or differential, and $s = 1$ for Riemannian manifolds. Then
$$d:\Omega^k(M)\to \Omega^{k+1}(M)$$
while
$$\delta:\Omega^k(M)\to \Omega^{k-1}(M).$$

The codifferential is not an antiderivation on the exterior algebra, in contrast to the exterior derivative.

The codifferential is the adjoint of the exterior derivative with respect to the square-integrable scalar product:
$$\langle\!\langle\eta,\delta \zeta\rangle\!\rangle \ =\ \langle\!\langle d\eta,\zeta\rangle\!\rangle,$$
where $\zeta$ is a $k$-form and $\eta$ a $(k\!-\!1)$-form. This property is useful as it can be used to define the codifferential even when the manifold is non-orientable (and the Hodge star operator not defined). The identity can be proved from Stokes' theorem for smooth forms:
$$0 \ =\ \int_M d (\eta \wedge {\star} \zeta)
\ =\
\int_M \left(d \eta \wedge {\star} \zeta + (-1)^{k-1}\eta \wedge {\star} \,{\star}^{-1} d\, {\star} \zeta\right)
\ =\
\langle\!\langle d\eta,\zeta\rangle\!\rangle - \langle\!\langle\eta,\delta\zeta\rangle\!\rangle,$$
provided $M$ has empty boundary, or $\eta$ or ${\star}\zeta$ has zero boundary values. (The proper definition of the above requires specifying a topological vector space that is closed and complete on the space of smooth forms. The Sobolev space is conventionally used; it allows the convergent sequence of forms $\zeta_i \to \zeta$ (as $i \to \infty$) to be interchanged with the combined differential and integral operations, so that $\langle\!\langle\eta,\delta \zeta_i\rangle\!\rangle \to \langle\!\langle\eta,\delta \zeta\rangle\!\rangle$ and likewise for sequences converging to $\eta$.)

Since the differential satisfies $d^2 = 0$, the codifferential has the corresponding property
$$\delta^2 = (-1)^n s^2 {\star} d {\star} {\star} d {\star} = (-1)^{nk+k+1} s^3 {\star} d^2 {\star} = 0.$$

The Laplace–deRham operator is given by
$$\Delta = (\delta + d)^2 = \delta d + d\delta$$
and lies at the heart of Hodge theory. It is symmetric:
$$\langle\!\langle\Delta \zeta,\eta\rangle\!\rangle = \langle\!\langle\zeta,\Delta \eta\rangle\!\rangle$$
and non-negative:
$$\langle\!\langle\Delta\eta,\eta\rangle\!\rangle \ge 0.$$

The Hodge star sends harmonic forms to harmonic forms. As a consequence of Hodge theory, the de Rham cohomology is naturally isomorphic to the space of harmonic k-forms, and so the Hodge star induces an isomorphism of cohomology groups
$${\star} : H^k_\Delta (M) \to H^{n-k}_\Delta(M),$$
which in turn gives canonical identifications via Poincaré duality of $H^k(M)$ with its dual space.

In coordinates, with notation as above, the codifferential of the form $\alpha$ may be written as
$$\delta \alpha=\  -\frac{1}{k!}g^{ml}\left(\frac{\partial}{\partial x_l} \alpha_{m,i_1, \dots, i_{k-1}} - \Gamma^j_{ml} \alpha_{j,i_1, \dots, i_{k-1}} \right) dx^{i_1} \wedge \dots \wedge dx^{i_{k-1}},$$
where here $\Gamma^{j}_{ml}$ denotes the Christoffel symbols of $\left\{\frac{\partial}{\partial x_1}, \ldots, \frac{\partial}{\partial x_n}\right\}$.

==== Poincaré lemma for codifferential ====
In analogy to the Poincaré lemma for exterior derivative, one can define its version for codifferential, which reads

If $\delta\omega=0$ for $\omega \in \Lambda^{k}(U)$, where $U$ is a star domain on a manifold, then there is $\alpha \in \Lambda^{k+1}(U)$ such that $\omega=\delta\alpha$.

A practical way of finding $\alpha$ is to use cohomotopy operator $h$, that is a local inverse of $\delta$. One has to define a homotopy operator

$$H\beta = \int_{0}^{1} \mathcal{K}\lrcorner\beta|_{F(t,x)}t^{k}dt,$$

where $F(t,x)=x_{0}+t(x-x_{0})$ is the linear homotopy between its center $x_{0}\in U$ and a point $x \in U$, and the (Euler) vector $\mathcal{K}=\sum_{i=1}^{n}(x-x_{0})^{i}\partial_{x^{i}}$ for $n=\dim(U)$ is inserted into the form $\beta \in \Lambda^{*}(U)$. We can then define cohomotopy operator as

$$h:\Lambda(U)\rightarrow \Lambda(U), \quad h:=\eta {\star}^{-1}H\star$$,

where $\eta \beta = (-1)^{k}\beta$ for $\beta \in \Lambda^{k}(U)$.

The cohomotopy operator fulfills (co)homotopy invariance formula

$$\delta h + h\delta = I - S_{x_{0}} ,$$

where $S_{x_{0}}={\star}^{-1}s_{x_{0}}^{*}{\star}$, and $s_{x_{0}}^{*}$ is the pullback along the constant map $s_{x_{0}}:x \rightarrow x_{0}$.

Therefore, if we want to solve the equation $\delta \omega =0$, applying cohomotopy invariance formula we get

$\omega= \delta h\omega + S_{x_{0}}\omega,$ where $h\omega\in \Lambda^{k+1}(U)$ is a differential form we are looking for, and "constant of integration" $S_{x_{0}}\omega$ vanishes unless $\omega$ is a top form.

Cohomotopy operator fulfills the following properties: $h^{2}=0, \quad \delta h \delta =\delta, \quad h\delta h =h$. They make it possible to use it to define anticoexact forms on $U$ by $\mathcal{Y}(U)=\{ \omega\in\Lambda(U)| \omega = h\delta \omega \}$, which together with exact forms $\mathcal{C}(U) =\{ \omega\in\Lambda(U)|\omega = \delta h\omega \}$ make a direct sum decomposition

$$\Lambda(U)=\mathcal{C}(U)\oplus \mathcal{Y}(U)$$.

This direct sum is another way of saying that the cohomotopy invariance formula is a decomposition of unity, and the projector operators on the summands fulfills idempotence formulas: $(h\delta)^{2}=h\delta, \quad (\delta h)^{2}=\delta h$.

These results are extension of similar results for exterior derivative.
