= George F. C. Griss =

Dutch mathematician and philosopher

G. F. C. Griss
- Born: 30 January 1898; Amsterdam
- Died: 2 August 1953 (aged 55); Blaricum
- Education: University of Amsterdam
- Scientific career
- Fields: Mathematics Idealism
- Doctoral advisor: Roland Weitzenböck

George François Cornelis Griss (30 January 1898, Amsterdam – 2 August 1953, Blaricum), usually cited as G. F. C. Griss, was a Dutch mathematician and philosopher, who was occupied with Hegelian idealism and Brouwers intuitionism and stated a negationless mathematics.

Griss was a student of L. E. J. Brouwer and formulated an intuitionism based on a Hegelian idealism. He obtained his Ph.D. with Roland Weitzenböck at the University of Amsterdam in July 1925. He was largely influenced by L. E. J. Brouwer, Gerrit Mannoury, Carry van Bruggen and Gerard Bolland, who brought Hegelian thought to the Netherlands. He published a number of articles about a negationless mathematics and one small book about idealistic philosophy, called Idealistische Filosofie (17 February 1946, Gouda), in which he lays down a typically Hegelian idealism, and incorporates elements from Bergson's Creative Evolution (L'Evolution créatrice).

== Publications ==
- Het volledige invariantensysteem van 2 covariante antisymmetrische tensoren van den 2den trap en een willekeurig aantal vectoren, K.A.W., Amsterdam, Verslag 34, 1925.
- Differentialinvarianten von Systemen von Vektoren (Ph.D. thesis) Groningen: Noordhoff, 1925.
- Differentialinvarianten von zwei kovarianten Vektoren in vier Veränderlichen, Proc. K.A.W. (Amsterdam), vol.33, 1930, pp. 176–179.
- Der Existenzsatz für ein wesentliches System bei Invarianten von Differentialformen, Proc. K.A.W. (Amsterdam), vol.33, 1930, pp. 491–494.
- Problemen der Invariantentheorie (public lecture) Groningen: Noordhoff, 1934.
- Die Differentialinvarianten eines Systems von n relativen kovarianten Vektoren in Rn, Proc. K.A.W. (Amsterdam), vol.37, 1934, pp. 82–87.
- Die Differentialinvarianten eines kovarianten symmetrischen Tensors vierter Stufe im binären Gebiet, Comp. Math. vol.1, 1934, pp. 238–247.
- Differentialvarianenten von relativen Vektoren, Comp. Math. vol.1, 1935, pp. 420–428.
- Die konformen Differentialinvarianten eines kovarianten symmetrischen Tensors vierter Stufe im binären Gebiet, Proc. K.A.W. (Amsterdam) vol. 39, 1936, pp. 947–955.
- Negatieloze intuïtionistisch wiskunde. Proceedings ("Verslagen") Nederlandse Akademie van Wetenschappen, Afdeling Natuurkunde, Vol.LIII, no.5, 1944, pp. 261–268 (includes German, English, and French summary).
- Idealistisch Filosofie, Arnhem: Van Loghum Slaterus, 1946.
- Negationless intuitionistic mathematics I, Proc. K.A.W. (Amsterdam) vo.49, 1946, pp. 1127–1133.
- Over de negatie, festive collection ("feestbundel") Prof. Dr. H.J. Pos, Amsterdam: Noord-Hollandse uitgeversmaatschappij, 1948, pp. 96–106.
- Mathématiques, Mystique et Philosophie, Mélanges philosophiques, Libr. 10th Int. Congr. Phil. II (1948), pp. 156–175.
- Logique des mathématiques intuitionistes sans négation, C. R. [Comptes Rendues] Ac. Sci. Paris, vol.227, 1948, pp. 946–948.
- Sur la Négation dans les Mathématiques et la Logique, Synthese, vol.7, 1948/1949, no.1-2 pp. 71–74.
- Negationless intuitionistic mathematics II, Proceedings [Koninklijke Nederlandse Akademie van Wetenschappen] [series A] Vol.LIII, no.4, 1950, pp. 456–463 or Indagationes Mathematicae, Vol.XII, Fasc.2, 1950.
- Logic of negationless intuitionistic mathematics, Proceedings [Koninklijke Nederlandse Akademie van Wetenschappen] Series A, Vol.LIV, no.1, 1951, pp. 41–49.
- Negationless intuitionistic mathematics III, Proceedings [Koninklijke Nederlandse Akademie van Wetenschappen] series A, Vol.LIV, no.2, 1951, pp. 193–199.
- Negationless intuitionistic mathematics IV, Proceedings [Koninklijke Nederlandse Akademie van Wetenschappen] series A, Vol.LIV, no.5, 1951, pp. 452–471 or Indagationes Mathematicae, Vol.XIII, no.5, 1951.

== Secondary literature ==
- H.J. Pos: G.F.C. Griss' Idealistische Filosofie, Algemeen Nederlands Tijdschrift voor Wijsbegeerte en Psychologie waarin opgenomen de Annalen van het Genootschap voor Wetenschappelijke Philosophie, 46e Jaargang, aflevering 1, october 1953. pp. 1–7.
- A. Heyting: Over de betekenis van het Wiskundige werk van G.F.C. Griss, ibidem, pp. 8–12.
- A. Heyting: G.F.C. Griss and his negationless intuitionistic mathematics, Synthese, Vol. IX, Issue 2, no.2, pp. 91–96
- H.J. Pos: G.F.C. Griss als wijsgerig humanist en als mens, De Nieuw Stem [1953], pp. 654–663.
- B. van Rootselaar, In memoriam Dr. G.F.C. Griss, Euclides [1953?] Tijdschrift voor de Didactiek der Exacte Vakken, pp. 42–45. (Contains bibliography.)
- G.F.C. Griss, 1898–1953 in the Album Academicum of the University of Amsterdam

== See also ==
- L. E. J. Brouwer
- Gerard Bolland
- Gerrit Mannoury
- Arend Heyting
- Philosophy of mind
- Philosophy of mathematics
