= Laplace–Beltrami operator =

Operator generalizing the Laplacian in differential geometry

In differential geometry, the Laplace–Beltrami operator is a generalization of the Laplace operator to functions defined on submanifolds in Euclidean space and, even more generally, on Riemannian and pseudo-Riemannian manifolds. It is named after Pierre-Simon Laplace and Eugenio Beltrami.

For any twice-differentiable real-valued function f defined on Euclidean space R^{n}, the Laplace operator (also known as the Laplacian) takes f to the divergence of its gradient vector field, which is the sum of the n pure second derivatives of f with respect to each vector of an orthonormal basis for R^{n}. Like the Laplacian, the Laplace–Beltrami operator is defined as the divergence of the gradient, and is a linear operator taking functions into functions. The operator can be extended to operate on tensors as the divergence of the covariant derivative. Alternatively, the operator can be generalized to operate on differential forms using the divergence and exterior derivative. The resulting operator is called the Laplace–de Rham operator (named after Georges de Rham).

== Details ==
The Laplace–Beltrami operator, like the Laplacian, is the (Riemannian) divergence of the (Riemannian) gradient:

$$\Delta f = {\rm div}( \nabla f).$$

An explicit formula in local coordinates is possible.

Suppose first that M is an oriented Riemannian manifold. The orientation allows one to specify a definite volume form on M, given in an oriented coordinate system x^{i} by

$$\operatorname{vol}_n := \sqrt{|g|} \;dx^1\wedge \cdots \wedge dx^n$$

where |g| := |det(g_{ij})| is the absolute value of the determinant of the metric tensor, and the dx^{i} are the 1-forms forming the dual frame to the frame

$$\partial_i := \frac {\partial}{\partial x^i}$$

of the tangent bundle $TM$ and $\wedge$ is the wedge product.

The divergence of a vector field $X$ on the manifold is then defined as the scalar function $\nabla \cdot X$ with the property

$$(\nabla \cdot X) \operatorname{vol}_n := L_X \operatorname{vol}_n$$

where L_{X} is the Lie derivative along the vector field X. In local coordinates, one obtains

$$\nabla \cdot X = \frac{1}{\sqrt{|g|}} \partial_i \left(\sqrt {|g|} X^i\right)$$

where here and below the Einstein notation is implied, so that the repeated index i is summed over.

The gradient of a scalar function ƒ is the vector field grad f that may be defined through the inner product $\langle\cdot,\cdot\rangle$ on the manifold, as

$$\langle \operatorname{grad} f(x) , v_x \rangle = df(x)(v_x)$$

for all vectors v_{x} anchored at point x in the tangent space T_{x}M of the manifold at point x. Here, dƒ is the exterior derivative of the function ƒ; it is a 1-form taking argument v_{x}. In local coordinates, one has

$$\left(\operatorname{grad} f\right)^i =
\partial^i f = g^{ij} \partial_j f$$

where g^{ij} are the components of the inverse of the metric tensor, so that g^{ij}g_{jk} = δ^{i}_{k} with δ^{i}_{k} the Kronecker delta.

Combining the definitions of the gradient and divergence, the formula for the Laplace–Beltrami operator applied to a scalar function ƒ is, in local coordinates

$$\Delta  f = \frac{1}{\sqrt {|g|}} \partial_i \left(\sqrt{|g|} g^{ij} \partial_j f \right).$$

If M is not oriented, then the above calculation carries through exactly as presented, except that the volume form must instead be replaced by a volume element (a density rather than a form). Neither the gradient nor the divergence actually depends on the choice of orientation, and so the Laplace–Beltrami operator itself does not depend on this additional structure.

== Formal self-adjointness ==
The exterior derivative $d$ and $- \nabla$ are formal adjoints, in the sense that for a compactly supported function $f$

$$\int_M df(X) \operatorname{vol}_n = - \int_M f  \nabla \cdot X \operatorname{vol}_n$$

where the last equality is an application of Stokes' theorem. Dualizing gives

$\int_M f \,\Delta h\,\operatorname{vol}_n = -\int_M \langle df, dh\rangle\, \operatorname{vol}_n$	2

for all compactly supported functions $f$ and $h$. Conversely, (2) characterizes the Laplace–Beltrami operator completely, in the sense that it is the only operator with this property.

As a consequence, the Laplace–Beltrami operator is negative and formally self-adjoint, meaning that for compactly supported functions $f$ and $h$,

$$\int_M f\,\Delta  h \operatorname{vol}_n = -\int_M \langle d f, d h \rangle \operatorname{vol}_n = \int_M h\,\Delta  f \operatorname{vol}_n.$$

Because the Laplace–Beltrami operator, as defined in this manner, is negative rather than positive, often it is defined with the opposite sign.

== Eigenvalues of the Laplace–Beltrami operator (Lichnerowicz–Obata theorem) ==
Let M denote a compact Riemannian manifold without boundary. We want to consider the eigenvalue equation,

$$-\Delta  u=\lambda u,$$

where $u$ is the eigenfunction associated with the eigenvalue $\lambda$. It can be shown using the self-adjointness proved above that the eigenvalues $\lambda$ are real. The compactness of the manifold $M$ allows one to show that the eigenvalues are discrete and furthermore, the vector space of eigenfunctions associated with a given eigenvalue $\lambda$, i.e. the eigenspaces are all finite-dimensional. Notice by taking the constant function as an eigenfunction, we get $\lambda=0$ is an eigenvalue. Also since we have considered $-\Delta$ an integration by parts shows that $\lambda\geq 0$. More precisely if we multiply the eigenvalue equation through by the eigenfunction $u$ and integrate the resulting equation on $M$ we get (using the notation $dV=\operatorname{vol}_n$):

$$-\int_M \Delta  u\ u\ dV=\lambda\int_Mu^2\ dV$$

Performing an integration by parts or what is the same thing as using the divergence theorem on the term on the left, and since $M$ has no boundary we get

$$-\int_M\Delta  u\ u\ dV=\int_M|\nabla u|^2\ dV$$

Putting the last two equations together we arrive at

$$\int_M|\nabla u|^2\ dV=\lambda\int_Mu^2\ dV$$

We conclude from the last equation that $\lambda\geq 0$.

A fundamental result of André Lichnerowicz states that: Given a compact n-dimensional Riemannian manifold with no boundary with $n\geq 2$. Assume the Ricci curvature satisfies the lower bound:

$$\operatorname{Ric}(X,X)\geq \kappa g(X,X),\kappa>0,$$

where $g(\cdot,\cdot)$ is the metric tensor and $X$ is any tangent vector on the manifold $M$. Then the first positive eigenvalue $\lambda_1$ of the eigenvalue equation satisfies the lower bound:

$$\lambda_1\geq \frac{n}{n-1}\kappa.$$

This lower bound is sharp and achieved on the sphere $\mathbb{S}^n$. In fact on $\mathbb{S}^2$ the eigenspace for $\lambda_1$ is three dimensional and spanned by the restriction of the coordinate functions $x_1,x_2,x_3$ from $\mathbb{R}^3$ to $\mathbb{S}^2$. Using spherical coordinates $(\theta,\phi)$, on $\mathbb{S}^2$ the two dimensional sphere, set

$$x_3=\cos\phi=u_1,$$

we see easily from the formula for the spherical Laplacian displayed below that

$$-\Delta _{\mathbb{S}^2}u_1=2u_1$$

Thus the lower bound in Lichnerowicz's theorem is achieved at least in two dimensions.

Conversely it was proved by Morio Obata, that if the n-dimensional compact Riemannian manifold without boundary were such that for the first positive eigenvalue $\lambda_1$ one has,

$$\lambda_1=\frac{n}{n-1}\kappa,$$

then the manifold is isometric to the n-dimensional sphere $\mathbb{S}^n\bigg(\sqrt{\frac{n-1}{\kappa}}\bigg)$, the sphere of radius $\sqrt{\frac{n-1}{\kappa}}$. Proofs of all these statements may be found in the book by Isaac Chavel. Analogous sharp bounds also hold for other geometries and for certain degenerate Laplacians associated with these geometries like the Kohn Laplacian (after Joseph J. Kohn) on a compact CR manifold. Applications there are to the global embedding of such CR manifolds in $\mathbb{C}^n.$

== Tensor Laplacian ==
The Laplace–Beltrami operator can be written using the trace (or contraction) of the iterated covariant derivative associated with the Levi-Civita connection. The Hessian (tensor) of a function $f$ is the symmetric 2-tensor

$\displaystyle \mbox{Hess} f \in \mathbf \Gamma(\mathsf T^*M \otimes \mathsf T^*M),$ $\mbox{Hess} f := \nabla^2 f \equiv \nabla \nabla f \equiv \nabla \mathrm df,$

where df denotes the (exterior) derivative of a function f.

Let X_{i} be a basis of tangent vector fields (not necessarily induced by a coordinate system). Then the components of Hess f are given by

$$(\mbox{Hess} f)_{ij} = \mbox{Hess} f(X_i, X_j) = \nabla_{X_i}\nabla_{X_j} f - \nabla_{\nabla_{X_i}X_j} f$$

This is easily seen to transform tensorially, since it is linear in each of the arguments X_{i}, X_{j}. The Laplace–Beltrami operator is then the trace (or contraction) of the Hessian with respect to the metric:

$$\displaystyle \Delta f := \mathrm{tr} \nabla \mathrm df \in C^\infty(M).$$

More precisely, this means

$$\displaystyle \Delta f(x) = \sum_{i=1}^n \nabla \mathrm df(X_i,X_i),$$

or in terms of the metric

$$\Delta  f = \sum_{ij} g^{ij} (\mbox{Hess} f)_{ij}.$$

In abstract indices, the operator is often written

$$\Delta  f = \nabla^a \nabla_a f$$

provided it is understood implicitly that this trace is in fact the trace of the Hessian tensor.

Because the covariant derivative extends canonically to arbitrary tensors, the Laplace–Beltrami operator defined on a tensor T by

$$\Delta  T = g^{ij}\left( \nabla_{X_i}(\nabla_{X_j} T) - \nabla_{\nabla_{X_i}X_j} T\right)$$

is well-defined.

== Laplace–de Rham operator ==
More generally, one can define a Laplacian differential operator on sections of the bundle of differential forms on a pseudo-Riemannian manifold. On a Riemannian manifold it is an elliptic operator, while on a Lorentzian manifold it is hyperbolic. The Laplace–de Rham operator is defined by

$$\Delta = \mathrm{d}\delta + \delta\mathrm{d} = (\mathrm{d}+\delta)^2,\;$$

where d is the exterior derivative or differential and δ is the codifferential, acting as (−1)^{kn+n+1}∗d∗ on k-forms, where ∗ is the Hodge star. The first order operator $\mathrm{d}+\delta$ is the Hodge–Dirac operator.

When computing the Laplace–de Rham operator on a scalar function f, we have δf = 0, so that

$$\Delta  f = \delta \, \mathrm df.$$

Up to an overall sign, the Laplace–de Rham operator is equivalent to the previous definition of the Laplace–Beltrami operator when acting on a scalar function; see the proof for details. On functions, the Laplace–de Rham operator is actually the negative of the Laplace–Beltrami operator, as the conventional normalization of the codifferential assures that the Laplace–de Rham operator is (formally) positive definite, whereas the Laplace–Beltrami operator is typically negative. The sign is merely a convention, and both are common in the literature.

The Laplace–de Rham operator differs more significantly from the tensor Laplacian restricted to act on skew-symmetric tensors. Apart from the incidental sign, the two operators differ by a Weitzenböck identity that explicitly involves the Ricci curvature tensor.

== Examples ==
Many examples of the Laplace–Beltrami operator can be worked out explicitly.

=== Euclidean space ===
In the usual (orthonormal) Cartesian coordinates x^{i} on Euclidean space, the metric is reduced to the Kronecker delta, and one therefore has $|g| = 1$. Consequently, in this case

$$\Delta  f = \frac{1}{\sqrt{|g|}} \partial_i \sqrt{|g|}\partial^i f = \partial_i \partial^i f$$

which is the ordinary Laplacian. In curvilinear coordinates, such as spherical or cylindrical coordinates, one obtains alternative expressions.

Similarly, the Laplace–Beltrami operator corresponding to the Minkowski metric with signature (− + + +) is the d'Alembertian.

=== Spherical Laplacian ===
The spherical Laplacian is the Laplace–Beltrami operator on the (n − 1)-sphere with its canonical metric of constant sectional curvature 1. It is convenient to regard the sphere as isometrically embedded into R^{n} as the unit sphere centred at the origin. Then for a function f on S^{n−1}, the spherical Laplacian is defined by

$$\Delta _{S^{n-1}}f(x) = \Delta  f(x/|x|)$$

where f(x/|x|) is the degree zero homogeneous extension of the function f to R^{n} − {0}, and $\Delta$ is the Laplacian of the ambient Euclidean space. Concretely, this is implied by the well-known formula for the Euclidean Laplacian in spherical polar coordinates:

$$\Delta f = r^{1-n}\frac{\partial}{\partial r}\left(r^{n-1}\frac{\partial f}{\partial r}\right) + r^{-2}\Delta _{S^{n-1}}f.$$

More generally, one can formulate a similar trick using the normal bundle to define the Laplace–Beltrami operator of any Riemannian manifold isometrically embedded as a hypersurface of Euclidean space.

One can also give an intrinsic description of the Laplace–Beltrami operator on the sphere in a normal coordinate system. Let (ϕ, ξ) be spherical coordinates on the sphere with respect to a particular point p of the sphere (the "north pole"), that is geodesic polar coordinates with respect to p. Here ϕ represents the latitude measurement along a unit speed geodesic from p, and ξ a parameter representing the choice of direction of the geodesic in S^{n−1}. Then the spherical Laplacian has the form:

$$\Delta _{S^{n-1}} f(\xi,\phi) = (\sin\phi)^{2-n} \frac{\partial}{\partial \phi}\left((\sin\phi)^{n-2}\frac{\partial f}{\partial \phi}\right) + (\sin\phi)^{-2}\Delta _\xi f$$

where $\Delta _\xi$ is the Laplace–Beltrami operator on the ordinary unit (n − 2)-sphere. In particular, for the ordinary 2-sphere using standard notation for polar coordinates we get:

$$\Delta _{S^{2}} f(\theta,\phi) = (\sin\phi)^{-1} \frac{\partial}{\partial \phi}\left(\sin\phi\frac{\partial f}{\partial \phi}\right) + (\sin\phi)^{-2} \frac{\partial^2}{\partial \theta^2}f$$

=== Hyperbolic space ===
A similar technique works in hyperbolic space. Here the hyperbolic space H^{n−1} can be embedded into the n dimensional Minkowski space, a real vector space equipped with the quadratic form

$$q(x) = x_1^2 - x_2^2-\cdots - x_n^2.$$

Then H^{n-1} is the subset of the future null cone in Minkowski space given by

$$H^{n-1} = \{ x \mid q(x) = 1, x_1>1\}. \,$$

Then

$$\Delta _{H^{n-1}} f = \left. \Box f\left(x/q(x)^{1/2}\right) \right| _{H^{n-1}}$$

Here $f(x/q(x)^{1/2})$ is the degree zero homogeneous extension of f to the interior of the future null cone and □ is the wave operator

$$\Box = \frac{\partial^2}{\partial x_1^2} - \cdots - \frac{\partial^2}{\partial x_n^2}.$$

The operator can also be written in polar coordinates. Let (t, ξ) be spherical coordinates on the sphere with respect to a particular point p of H^{n−1} (say, the center of the Poincaré disc). Here t represents the hyperbolic distance from p and ξ a parameter representing the choice of direction of the geodesic in S^{n−2}. Then the hyperbolic Laplacian has the form:

$$\Delta _{H^{n-1}} f(t,\xi) = \sinh(t)^{2-n} \frac{\partial}{\partial t}\left(\sinh(t)^{n-2}\frac{\partial f}{\partial t}\right) + \sinh(t)^{-2}\Delta _\xi f$$

where $\Delta _\xi$ is the Laplace–Beltrami operator on the ordinary unit (n − 2)-sphere. In particular, for the hyperbolic plane using standard notation for polar coordinates we get:

$$\Delta _{H^{2}} f(r,\theta) = \sinh(r)^{-1} \frac{\partial}{\partial r}\left(\sinh(r)\frac{\partial f}{\partial r}\right) + \sinh(r)^{-2} \frac{\partial^2}{\partial \theta^2}f$$

== See also ==
- Covariant derivative
- Laplacian operators in differential geometry
- Laplace operator
