= Weitzenböck identity =

Relates 2 second-order elliptic operators on a manifold with the same principal symbol

In mathematics, in particular in differential geometry, mathematical physics, and representation theory, a Weitzenböck identity, named after Roland Weitzenböck, expresses a relationship between two second-order elliptic operators on a manifold with the same principal symbol. Usually Weitzenböck formulae are implemented for G-invariant self-adjoint operators between vector bundles associated to some principal G-bundle, although the precise conditions under which such a formula exists are difficult to formulate. This article focuses on three examples of Weitzenböck identities: from Riemannian geometry, spin geometry, and complex analysis.

== Riemannian geometry ==
In Riemannian geometry there are two notions of the Laplacian on differential forms over an oriented compact Riemannian manifold M. The first definition uses the divergence operator δ defined as the formal adjoint of the de Rham operator d:
$$\int_M \langle \alpha,\delta\beta\rangle := \int_M\langle d\alpha,\beta\rangle$$
where α is any p-form and β is any (p + 1)-form, and $\langle \cdot, \cdot \rangle$ is the metric induced on the bundle of (p + 1)-forms. The usual form Laplacian is then given by
$$\Delta = d\delta +\delta d.$$

On the other hand, the Levi-Civita connection supplies a differential operator
$$\nabla:\Omega^p M \rightarrow \Omega^1 M \otimes \Omega^p M ,$$
where Ω^{p}M is the bundle of p-forms. The Bochner Laplacian is given by
$$\Delta'=\nabla^*\nabla$$
where $\nabla^*$ is the adjoint of $\nabla$. This is also known as the connection or rough Laplacian.

The Weitzenböck formula then asserts that
$$\Delta' - \Delta = A$$
where A is a linear operator of order zero involving only the curvature.

The precise form of A is given, up to an overall sign depending on curvature conventions, by
$$A=\frac{1}{2}\langle R(\theta,\theta)\#,\#\rangle + \operatorname{Ric}(\theta,\#) ,$$
where

- R is the Riemann curvature tensor,
- Ric is the Ricci tensor,
- $\theta:T^*M\otimes\Omega^pM\rightarrow\Omega^{p+1}M$ is the map that takes the wedge product of a 1-form and p-form and gives a (p+1)-form,
- $\#:\Omega^{p+1}M\rightarrow T^*M\otimes\Omega^pM$ is the universal derivation inverse to θ on 1-forms.

== Spin geometry ==
If M is an oriented spin manifold with Dirac operator ð, then one may form the spin Laplacian Δ = ð^{2} on the spin bundle. On the other hand, the Levi-Civita connection extends to the spin bundle to yield a differential operator
$$\nabla:\Gamma(SM)\rightarrow \Gamma(T^*M\otimes SM).$$
As in the case of Riemannian manifolds, let $\Delta'=\nabla^*\nabla$. This is another self-adjoint operator and, moreover, has the same leading symbol as the spin Laplacian. The Weitzenböck formula yields:
$$\Delta' - \Delta = -\frac{1}{4}Sc$$
where Sc is the scalar curvature. This result is also known as the Lichnerowicz formula.

== Complex differential geometry ==
If M is a compact Kähler manifold, there is a Weitzenböck formula relating the $\bar{\partial}$-Laplacian (see Dolbeault complex) and the Euclidean Laplacian on (p,q)-forms. Specifically, let
$$\Delta = \bar{\partial}^*\bar{\partial}+\bar{\partial}\bar{\partial}^*,$$
and
$$\Delta' = -\sum_k\nabla_k\nabla_{\bar{k}}$$
in a unitary frame at each point.

According to the Weitzenböck formula, if $\alpha\in\Omega^{(p,q)}M$, then
$$\Delta^\prime\alpha-\Delta\alpha=A(\alpha)$$
where $A$ is an operator of order zero involving the curvature. Specifically, if
$$\alpha = \alpha_{i_1 i_2 \dots i_p\bar{j}_1 \bar{j}_2 \dots \bar{j}_q}$$
in a unitary frame, then
$$A(\alpha) = -\sum_{k,j_s} \operatorname{Ric}_{\bar{j}_\alpha}^{\bar{k}}\alpha_{i_1 i_2 \dots i_p \bar{j}_1 \bar{j}_2 \dots \bar{k}\dots \bar{j}_q}$$
with k in the s-th place.

== Other Weitzenböck identities ==
- In conformal geometry there is a Weitzenböck formula relating a particular pair of differential operators defined on the tractor bundle. See Branson, T. and Gover, A.R., "Conformally Invariant Operators, Differential Forms, Cohomology and a Generalisation of Q-Curvature", Communications in Partial Differential Equations, 30 (2005) 1611–1669.

== See also ==
- Bochner identity
- Bochner–Kodaira–Nakano identity
- Laplacian operators in differential geometry
