= Prescribed Ricci curvature problem =

Riemannian geometry mathematical problem

In Riemannian geometry, a branch of mathematics, the prescribed Ricci curvature problem is as follows: given a smooth manifold M and a symmetric 2-tensor h, construct a metric on M whose Ricci curvature tensor equals h.

== See also ==
- Prescribed scalar curvature problem
