= Spinh structure =

Special tangential structure

In spin geometry, a spin^{h} structure (or quaternionic spin structure) is a generalization of a spin structure. In mathematics, these are used to describe spinor bundles and spinors, which in physics are used to describe spin, an intrinsic angular momentum of particles after which they have been named. Since spin^{h} structures also exist under weakened conditions, which might not allow spin structures, they provide a suitable alternative for such situations. Orientable manifolds with spin^{h} structures are called spin^{h} manifolds. H stands for the quaternions, which are denoted $\mathbb{H}$ and appear in the definition of the underlying spin^{h} group.

== Definition ==
Let $M$ be a $n$-dimensional orientable manifold. Its tangent bundle $TM$ is described by a classifying map $M\rightarrow\operatorname{BSO}(n)$ into the classifying space $\operatorname{BSO}(n)$ of the special orthogonal group $\operatorname{SO}(n)$. It can factor over the map $\operatorname{BSpin}^\mathrm{h}(n)\rightarrow\operatorname{BSO}(n)$ induced by the canonical projection $\operatorname{Spin}^\mathrm{h}(n)\twoheadrightarrow\operatorname{SO}(n)$ on classifying spaces. In this case, the classifying map lifts to a continuous map $M\rightarrow\operatorname{BSpin}^\mathrm{h}(n)$ into the classifying space $\operatorname{BSpin}^\mathrm{h}(n)$ of the spin^{h} group $\operatorname{Spin}^\mathrm{h}(n)$. Its homotopy class is called spin^{h} structure.

Assume $M$ has a spin^{h} structure. Let then $\operatorname{Spin}^\mathrm{h}(M)$ denote the set of spin^{h} structures on $M$. The first symplectic group $\operatorname{Sp}(1)$ is the second factor of the spin^{h} group and using its classifying space $\operatorname{BSp}(1) \cong\operatorname{BSU}(2)$, which is the infinite quaternionic projective space $\mathbb{H}P^\infty$ and through its Postnikov tower projects onto the Eilenberg–MacLane space $K(\mathbb{Z},4)$, there is a map:

$$\operatorname{Spin}^\mathrm{h}(M)
\cong[M,\operatorname{BSp}(1)]
\cong[M,\mathbb{H}P^\infty]
\rightarrow[M,K(\mathbb{Z},4)]
\cong H^4(M,\mathbb{Z}).$$

The former isomorphism follows from the Puppe sequence for the fibration $\mathbb{H}P^\infty\hookrightarrow\operatorname{BSpin}^\mathrm{h}(n)\twoheadrightarrow\operatorname{BSO}(n)$ (when applying $[M,-]$). Although this map is not a bijection in general, it is in special cases, for example for a 4-manifold $M$.

Due to the canonical projection $\operatorname{BSpin}^\mathrm{h}(n)\rightarrow\operatorname{SU}(2)/\mathbb{Z}_2 \cong\operatorname{SO}(3)$, every spin^{h} structure induces a principal $\operatorname{SO}(3)$-bundle or equivalently a orientable real vector bundle of third rank.

== Properties ==
- Every spin and even every spin^{c} structure induces a spin^{h} structure. Reverse implications don't hold as the complex projective plane $\mathbb{C}P^2$ and the Wu manifold $\operatorname{SU}(3)/\operatorname{SO}(3)$ show.
- If an orientable manifold $M$ has a spin^{h} structure, then its fifth integral Stiefel–Whitney class $W_5(M) \in H^5(M,\mathbb{Z})$ vanishes, hence is the image of the fourth ordinary Stiefel–Whitney class $w_4(M) \in H^4(M,\mathbb{Z})$ under the canonical map $H^4(M,\mathbb{Z}_2)\rightarrow H^4(M,\mathbb{Z})$.
- Every compact orientable smooth manifold with seven or less dimensions has a spin^{h} structure.
- In eight dimensions, there are infinitely many homotopy types of closed simply connected manifolds without spin^{h} structure.
- For a compact spin^{h} manifold $M$ of even dimension with either vanishing fourth Betti number $b_4(M)=\dim H^4(M,\mathbb{R})$ or the first Pontrjagin class $p_1(E)\in H^4(M,\mathbb{Z})$ of its canonical principal $\operatorname{SO}(3)$-bundle $E\twoheadrightarrow M$ being torsion, twice its Â genus $2\widehat{A}(M)$ is integer.

The following properties hold more generally for the lift on the Lie group $\operatorname{Spin}^k(n) :=\left( \operatorname{Spin}(n)\times\operatorname{Spin}(k) \right)/\mathbb{Z}_2$, with the particular case $k=3$ giving:

- If $M\times N$ is a spin^{h} manifold, then $M$ and $N$ are spin^{h} manifolds.
- If $M$ is a spin manifold, then $M\times N$ is a spin^{h} manifold iff $N$ is a spin^{h} manifold.
- If $M$ and $N$ are spin^{h} manifolds of same dimension, then their connected sum $M\# N$ is a spin^{h} manifold.
- The following conditions are equivalent:
  - $M$ is a spin^{h} manifold.
  - There is a real vector bundle $E\twoheadrightarrow M$ of third rank, so that $TM\oplus E$ has a spin structure or equivalently $w_2(TM\oplus E) =0$.
  - $M$ can be immersed in a spin manifold with three dimensions more.
  - $M$ can be embedded in a spin manifold with three dimensions more.

== Cohomology of infinite classifying space ==
The cohomology ring of the infinite classifying space $\operatorname{BSpin}^\mathrm{h} :=\lim_{n\rightarrow\infty}\operatorname{BSpin}^\mathrm{h}(n)$ with coefficients in $\mathbb{Z}_2$ can be expressed using Steenrod squares and Wu classes:

$$H^*(\operatorname{BSpin}^\mathrm{h},\mathbb{Z}_2)
\cong H^*(\operatorname{BSO},\mathbb{Z}_2)/(\operatorname{Sq}^1\nu_{2^r},r\geq 2).$$

== See also ==
- Spin^{c} structure

== Literature ==
- Christian Bär (1999). "Elliptic symbols". Mathematische Nachrichten. 201 (1).
- Michael Albanese und Aleksandar Milivojević (2021). "Spin^{h} and further generalisations of spin". Journal of Geometry and Physics. 164: 104–174. arXiv:2008.04934. doi:10.1016/j.geomphys.2022.104709.
- H. Blaine Lawson (2023-01-23). "Spinʰ Manifolds". arXiv:2301.09683v1 [math.DG].
- Jiahao Hu (2023-12-08). "Invariants of Real Vector Bundles". arXiv:2310.05061 [math.AT].
