= Spinc structure =

Special tangential structure

In spin geometry, a spin^{c} structure (or complex spin structure) is a generalization of a spin structure. In mathematics, these are used to describe spinor bundles and spinors, which in physics are used to describe spin, an intrinsic angular momentum of particles after which they have been named. Since spin^{c} structures also exist under weakened conditions, which might not allow spin structures, they provide a suitable alternative for such situations. Orientable manifolds with a spin^{c} structure are called spin^{c} manifolds. C stands for the complex numbers, which are denoted $\mathbb{C}$ and appear in the definition of the underlying spin^{c} group.

In four dimensions, a spin^{c} structure defines two complex plane bundles, which can be used to describe negative and positive chirality of spinors, for example in the Dirac equation of relativistic quantum field theory. Another central application is Seiberg–Witten theory, which uses them to study 4-manifolds.

== Definition ==
Let $M$ be a $n$-dimensional orientable manifold. Its tangent bundle $TM$ is described by a classifying map $M\rightarrow\operatorname{BSO}(n)$ into the classifying space $\operatorname{BSO}(n)$ of the special orthogonal group $\operatorname{SO}(n)$. It can factor over the map $\operatorname{BSpin}^\mathrm{c}(n)\rightarrow\operatorname{BSO}(n)$ induced by the canonical projection $\operatorname{Spin}^\mathrm{c}(n)\twoheadrightarrow\operatorname{SO}(n)$ on classifying spaces. In this case, the classifying map lifts to a continuous map $M\rightarrow\operatorname{BSpin}^\mathrm{c}(n)$ into the classifying space $\operatorname{BSpin}^\mathrm{c}(n)$ of the spin^{c} group $\operatorname{Spin}^\mathrm{c}(n)$. Its homotopy class is called spin^{c} structure.

Assume $M$ has a spin^{c} structure. Let then $\operatorname{Spin}^\mathrm{c}(M)$ denote the set of spin^{c} structures on $M$. The first unitary group $\operatorname{U}(1)$ is the second factor of the spin^{c} group and using its classifying space $\operatorname{BU}(1) \cong\operatorname{BSO}(2)$, which is the infinite complex projective space $\mathbb{C}P^\infty$ and a model of the Eilenberg–MacLane space $K(\mathbb{Z},2)$, there is a bijection:

$$\operatorname{Spin}^\mathrm{c}(M)
\cong[M,\operatorname{BU}(1)]
\cong[M,\mathbb{C}P^\infty]
\cong[M,K(\mathbb{Z},2)]
\cong H^2(M,\mathbb{Z}).$$

The former isomorphism follows from the Puppe sequence for the fibration $\mathbb{C}P^\infty\hookrightarrow\operatorname{BSpin}^\mathrm{c}(n)\twoheadrightarrow\operatorname{BSO}(n)$ (when applying $[M,-]$).

Due to the canonical projection $\operatorname{BSpin}^\mathrm{c}(n)\rightarrow\operatorname{U}(1)/\mathbb{Z}_2 \cong\operatorname{U}(1)$, every spin^{c} structure induces a principal $\operatorname{U}(1)$-bundle or equivalently a complex line bundle.

== Properties ==
- Every spin structure induces a canonical spin^{c} structure. The reverse implication doesn't hold as the complex projective plane $\mathbb{C}P^2$ shows.
- Every spin^{c} structure induces a canonical spin^{h} structure. The reverse implication doesn't hold as the Wu manifold $\operatorname{SU}(3)/\operatorname{SO}(3)$ shows.
- An orientable manifold $M$ has a spin^{c} structure iff its third integral Stiefel–Whitney class $W_3(M) \in H^3(M,\mathbb{Z})$ vanishes. This class $W_3(M)$ is the image of the second ordinary Stiefel–Whitney class $w_2(M) \in H^2(M,\mathbb{Z}_2)$ under the Bockstein homomorphism $H^2(M,\mathbb{Z}_2)\rightarrow H^3(M,\mathbb{Z})$.
- Every orientable smooth manifold with four or less dimensions has a spin^{c} structure.
- Every almost complex manifold has a spin^{c} structure.
- For a compact spin^{c} manifold $M$, for which a torsion class $c\in H^2(M,\mathbb{Z})$ with $w_2(M)=c\operatorname{mod}2$ exists and which has a Riemannian metric of overall positive scalar curvature, its Â genus vanishes, hence $\widehat{A}(M)=0$.

The following properties hold more generally for the lift on the Lie group $\operatorname{Spin}^k(n) :=\left( \operatorname{Spin}(n)\times\operatorname{Spin}(k) \right)/\mathbb{Z}_2$, with the particular case $k=2$ giving:

- If $M\times N$ is a spin^{c} manifold, then $M$ and $N$ are spin^{c} manifolds.
- If $M$ is a spin manifold, then $M\times N$ is a spin^{c} manifold iff $N$ is a spin^{c} manifold.
- If $M$ and $N$ are spin^{c} manifolds of same dimension, then their connected sum $M\# N$ is a spin^{c} manifold.
- The following conditions are equivalent:
  - $M$ is a spin^{c} manifold.
  - There is a real plane bundle $E\twoheadrightarrow M$, so that $TM\oplus E$ has a spin structure or equivalently $w_2(TM\oplus E) =0$.
  - $M$ can be immersed in a spin manifold with two dimensions more.
  - $M$ can be embedded in a spin manifold with two dimensions more.

== Cohomology of infinite classifying space ==
The cohomology ring of the infinite classifying space $\operatorname{BSpin}^\mathrm{c} :=\lim_{n\rightarrow\infty}\operatorname{BSpin}^\mathrm{c}(n)$ with coefficients in $\mathbb{Z}_2$ can be expressed using Steenrod squares and Wu classes:

$$H^*(\operatorname{BSpin}^\mathrm{c},\mathbb{Z}_2)
\cong H^*(\operatorname{BSO},\mathbb{Z}_2)/(\operatorname{Sq}^1\nu_{2^r},r\geq 1).$$

== See also ==
- Spin^{h} structure

== Literature ==
- Lawson, H. Blaine; Michelsohn, Marie-Louise (1990-02-21). Spin Geometry. Princeton University Press. ISBN 9780691085425.
- Blake Mellor (1995-09-18). "Spin^{c} manifolds" (PDF).
- "Stable complex and Spin^{c}-structures" (PDF).
- Liviu I. Nicolaescu. Notes on Seiberg-Witten Theory (PDF).
- Michael Albanese und Aleksandar Milivojević (2021). "Spin^{h} and further generalisations of spin". Journal of Geometry and Physics. 164: 104–174. arXiv:2008.04934. doi:10.1016/j.geomphys.2022.104709.
- H. Blaine Lawson (2023-01-23). "Spinʰ Manifolds". arXiv:2301.09683v1 [math.DG].
- Jiahao Hu (2023-12-08). "Invariants of Real Vector Bundles". arXiv:2310.05061 [math.AT].
