= Spinc group =

Twisted spin group

In spin geometry, a spin^{c} group (or complex spin group) is a Lie group obtained by the spin group through twisting with the first unitary group. C stands for the complex numbers, which are denoted $\mathbb{C}$. An important application of spin^{c} groups is for spin^{c} structures, which are central for Seiberg–Witten theory.

== Definition ==
The spin group $\operatorname{Spin}(n)$ is a double cover of the special orthogonal group $\operatorname{SO}(n)$, hence $\mathbb{Z}_2$ acts on it with $\operatorname{Spin}(n)/\Z_2\cong\operatorname{SO}(n)$. Furthermore, $\mathbb{Z}_2$ also acts on the first unitary group $\operatorname{U}(1)$ through the antipodal identification $y\sim -y$. The spin^{c} group is then:

$$\operatorname{Spin}^\mathrm{c}(n)
:=\left(
\operatorname{Spin}(n)\times\operatorname{U}(1)
\right)/\mathbb{Z}_2$$

with $(x,y)\sim(-x,-y)$. It is also denoted $\operatorname{Spin}^\mathbb{C}(n)$. Using the exceptional isomorphism $\operatorname{Spin}(2) \cong\operatorname{U}(1)$, one also has $\operatorname{Spin}^\mathrm{c}(n) =\operatorname{Spin}^2(n)$ with:

$$\operatorname{Spin}^k(n)
:=\left(
\operatorname{Spin}(n)\times\operatorname{Spin}(k)
\right)/\mathbb{Z}_2.$$

== Low-dimensional examples ==
- $\operatorname{Spin}^\mathrm{c}(1) \cong\operatorname{U}(1) \cong\operatorname{SO}(2)$, induced by the isomorphism $\operatorname{Spin}(1) \cong\operatorname{O}(1) \cong\mathbb{Z}_2$
- $\operatorname{Spin}^\mathrm{c}(3) \cong\operatorname{U}(2)$, induced by the exceptional isomorphism $\operatorname{Spin}(3) \cong\operatorname{Sp}(1) \cong\operatorname{SU}(2)$. Since furthermore $\operatorname{Spin}(2) \cong\operatorname{U}(1) \cong\operatorname{SO}(2)$, one also has $\operatorname{Spin}^\mathrm{c}(3) \cong\operatorname{Spin}^\mathrm{h}(2)$.
- $\operatorname{Spin}^\mathrm{c}(4) \cong\operatorname{U}(2)\times_{\operatorname{U}(1)}\operatorname{U}(2)$, induced by the exceptional isomorphism $\operatorname{Spin}(4) \cong\operatorname{SU}(2)\times\operatorname{SU}(2)$
- $\operatorname{Spin}^\mathrm{c}(6) \rightarrow\operatorname{U}(4)$ is a double cover, induced by the exceptional isomorphism $\operatorname{Spin}(6) \cong\operatorname{SU}(4)$

== Properties ==
For all higher abelian homotopy groups, one has:

$$\pi_k\operatorname{Spin}^\mathrm{c}(n)
\cong\pi_k\operatorname{Spin}(n)\times\pi_k\operatorname{U}(1)
\cong\pi_k\operatorname{SO}(n)$$

for $k\geq 2$.

== See also ==
- Spin^{h} group

== Literature ==
- Lawson, Herbert Blaine Jr.; Michelsohn, Marie-Louise (1989). Spin Geometry. Princeton Mathematical Series. Vol. 38. Princeton: Princeton University Press. doi:10.1515/9781400883912. ISBN 978-1-4008-8391-2.
- Christian Bär (1999). "Elliptic symbols". Mathematische Nachrichten. 201 (1).
- "Stable complex and Spin^{c}-structures" (PDF).
- Liviu I. Nicolaescu. Notes on Seiberg-Witten Theory (PDF).
