= Clifford analysis =

Clifford analysis, using Clifford algebras named after William Kingdon Clifford, is the study of Dirac operators, and Dirac type operators in analysis and geometry, together with their applications. Examples of Dirac type operators include, but are not limited to, the Hodge–Dirac operator, $d+{\star}d{\star}$ on a Riemannian manifold, the Dirac operator in euclidean space and its inverse on $C_{0}^{\infty}(\mathbf{R}^{n})$ and their conformal equivalents on the sphere, the Laplacian in euclidean n-space and the Atiyah–Singer–Dirac operator on a spin manifold, Rarita–Schwinger/Stein–Weiss type operators, conformal Laplacians, spinorial Laplacians and Dirac operators on Spin^{C} manifolds, systems of Dirac operators, the Paneitz operator, Dirac operators on hyperbolic space, the hyperbolic Laplacian and Weinstein equations.

== Euclidean space ==
In Euclidean space the Dirac operator has the form

$$D=\sum_{j=1}^{n}e_{j}\frac{\partial}{\partial x_{j}}$$

where e_{1}, ..., e_{n} is an orthonormal basis for R^{n}, and R^{n} is considered to be embedded in a complex Clifford algebra, Cl_{n}(C) so that e_{j}^{2} = −1.

This gives

$$D^{2} = -\Delta_{n}$$

where Δ_{n} is the Laplacian in n-euclidean space.

The fundamental solution to the euclidean Dirac operator is

$$G(x-y):=\frac{1}{\omega_{n}}\frac{x-y}{\|x-y\|^n}$$

where ω_{n} is the surface area of the unit sphere S^{n−1}.

Note that

$$D\frac{1}{(n-2)\omega_{n}\|x-y\|^{n-2}}=G(x-y)$$

where

$$\frac{1}{(n-2)\;\omega_{n}\;\|x-y\|^{n-2}}$$

is the fundamental solution to Laplace's equation for n ≥ 3.

The most basic example of a Dirac operator is the Cauchy–Riemann operator

$$\frac{\partial}{\partial x}+i\frac{\partial}{\partial y}$$

in the complex plane. Indeed, many basic properties of one variable complex analysis follow through for many first order Dirac type operators. In euclidean space this includes a Cauchy Theorem, a Cauchy integral formula, Morera's theorem, Taylor series, Laurent series and Liouville Theorem. In this case the Cauchy kernel is G(x−y). The proof of the Cauchy integral formula is the same as in one complex variable and makes use of the fact that each non-zero vector x in euclidean space has a multiplicative inverse in the Clifford algebra, namely

$$-\frac{x}{\|x\|^{2}}\in\mathbf{R}^{n}.$$

Up to a sign this inverse is the Kelvin inverse of x. Solutions to the euclidean Dirac equation Df = 0 are called (left) monogenic functions. Monogenic functions are special cases of harmonic spinors on a spin manifold.

In 3 and 4 dimensions Clifford analysis is sometimes referred to as quaternionic analysis. When n = 4, the Dirac operator is sometimes referred to as the Cauchy–Riemann–Fueter operator. Further some aspects of Clifford analysis are referred to as hypercomplex analysis.

Clifford analysis has analogues of Cauchy transforms, Bergman kernels, Szegő kernels, Plemelj operators, Hardy spaces, a Kerzman–Stein formula and a Π, or Beurling–Ahlfors, transform. These have all found applications in solving boundary value problems, including moving boundary value problems, singular integrals and classic harmonic analysis. In particular Clifford analysis has been used to solve, in certain Sobolev spaces, the full water wave problem in 3D. This method works in all dimensions greater than 2.

Much of Clifford analysis works if we replace the complex Clifford algebra by a real Clifford algebra, Cl_{n}. This is not the case though when we need to deal with the interaction between the Dirac operator and the Fourier transform.

== The Fourier transform ==
When we consider upper half space R^{n,+} with boundary R^{n−1}, the span of e_{1}, ..., e_{n−1}, under the Fourier transform the symbol of the Dirac operator

$$D_{n-1} = \sum_{j=1}^{n-1} \frac \partial {\partial x_j}$$

is iζ where

$$\zeta=\zeta_1 e_1 +\cdots+ \zeta_{n-1}e_{n-1}.$$

In this setting the Plemelj formulas are

$$\pm\tfrac{1}{2}+G(x-y)|_{\mathbf{R}^{n-1}}$$

and the symbols for these operators are, up to a sign,

$$\frac{1}{2} \left (1\pm i\frac{\zeta}{\|\zeta\|} \right ).$$

These are projection operators, otherwise known as mutually annihilating idempotents, on the space of Cl_{n}(C) valued square integrable functions on R^{n−1}.

Note that

$$G|_{\mathbf{R}^n}=\sum_{j=1}^{n-1} e_j R_j$$

where R_{j} is the j-th Riesz potential,

$$\frac{x_j}{\|x\|^n}.$$

As the symbol of $G|_{\mathbf{R}^{n}}$ is

$$\frac{i\zeta}{\|\zeta\|}$$

it is easily determined from the Clifford multiplication that

$$\sum_{j=1}^{n-1} R_j^2=1.$$

So the convolution operator $G|_{\mathbf{R}^{n}}$ is a natural generalization to euclidean space of the Hilbert transform.

Suppose U′ is a domain in R^{n−1} and g(x) is a Cl_{n}(C) valued real analytic function. Then g has a Cauchy–Kovalevskaia extension to the Dirac equation on some neighborhood of U′ in R^{n}. The extension is explicitly given by

$$\sum_{j=0}^\infty \left (x_n e_n^{-1}D_{n-1} \right )^j g(x).$$

When this extension is applied to the variable x in

$$e^{-i\langle x,\zeta\rangle} \left (\tfrac{1}{2} \left (1\pm i\frac{\zeta}{\|\zeta\|} \right ) \right )$$

we get that

$$e^{-i\langle x,\zeta\rangle}$$

is the restriction to R^{n−1} of E_{+} + E_{−} where E_{+} is a monogenic function in upper half space and E_{−} is a monogenic function in lower half space.

There is also a Paley–Wiener theorem in n-Euclidean space arising in Clifford analysis.

== Conformal structure ==
Many Dirac type operators have a covariance under conformal change in metric. This is true for the Dirac operator in euclidean space, and the Dirac operator on the sphere under Möbius transformations. Consequently, this holds true for Dirac operators on conformally flat manifolds and conformal manifolds which are simultaneously spin manifolds.

=== Cayley transform (stereographic projection) ===
The Cayley transform or stereographic projection from R^{n} to the unit sphere S^{n} transforms the euclidean Dirac operator to a spherical Dirac operator D_{S}. Explicitly

$$D_S=x \left(\Gamma_n + \frac n 2 \right)$$

where Γ_{n} is the spherical Beltrami–Dirac operator

$$\sum\nolimits_{1\leq i<j\leq n+1}e_{i}e_{j} \left (x_{i}\frac{\partial}{\partial x_{j}}-x_{j}\frac{\partial}{\partial x_{i}} \right )$$

and x in S^{n}.

The Cayley transform over n-space is

$$y=C(x)=(e_{n+1}x+1)(x+e_{n+1})^{-1}, \qquad x \in \mathbf{R}^n.$$

Its inverse is

$$x=(-e_{n+1}+1)(y-e_{n+1})^{-1}.$$

For a function f(x) defined on a domain U in n-euclidean space and a solution to the Dirac equation, then

$$J(C^{-1},y) f(C^{-1}(y))$$

is annihilated by D_{S}, on C(U) where

$$J(C^{-1},y)=\frac{y-e_{n+1}}{\|y-e_{n+1}\|^n}.$$

Further

$$D_S(D_S-x)=\triangle_S,$$

the conformal Laplacian or Yamabe operator on S^{n}. Explicitly

$$\triangle_S = -\triangle_{LB}+\tfrac 1 4 n(n-2)$$

where $\triangle_{LB}$ is the Laplace–Beltrami operator on S^{n}. The operator $\triangle_S$ is, via the Cayley transform, conformally equivalent to the euclidean Laplacian. Also

$$D_s(D_S-x)(D_S-x)(D_S-2x)$$

is the Paneitz operator,

$$-\triangle_S(\triangle_S+2),$$

on the n-sphere. Via the Cayley transform this operator is conformally equivalent to the bi-Laplacian, $\triangle_n^2$. These are all examples of operators of Dirac type.

=== Möbius transform ===
A Möbius transform over n-euclidean space can be expressed as

$$\frac{ax+b}{cx+d},$$

where a, b, c and d ∈ Cl_{n} and satisfy certain constraints. The associated 2 × 2 matrix is called an Ahlfors–Vahlen matrix. If

$$y=M(x)+\frac{ax+b}{cx+d}$$

and Df(y) = 0 then $J(M,x)f(M(x))$ is a solution to the Dirac equation where

$$J(M,x)=\frac{\widetilde{cx+d}}{\|cx+d\|^{n}}$$

and ~ is a basic antiautomorphism acting on the Clifford algebra. The operators D^{k}, or Δ_{n}^{k/2} when k is even, exhibit similar covariances under Möbius transform including the Cayley transform.

When ax+b and cx+d are non-zero they are both members of the Clifford group.

As

$$\frac{ax+b}{cx+d}=\frac{-ax-b}{-cx-d}$$

then we have a choice in sign in defining J(M, x). This means that for a conformally flat manifold M we need a spin structure on M in order to define a spinor bundle on whose sections we can allow a Dirac operator to act. Explicit simple examples include the n-cylinder, the Hopf manifold obtained from n-euclidean space minus the origin, and generalizations of k-handled toruses obtained from upper half space by factoring it out by actions of generalized modular groups acting on upper half space totally discontinuously. A Dirac operator can be introduced in these contexts. These Dirac operators are special examples of Atiyah–Singer–Dirac operators.

== Atiyah–Singer–Dirac operator ==
Given a spin manifold M with a spinor bundle S and a smooth section s(x) in S then, in terms of a local orthonormal basis e_{1}(x), ..., e_{n}(x) of the tangent bundle of M, the Atiyah–Singer–Dirac operator acting on s is defined to be

$$Ds(x)=\sum_{j=1}^{n}e_{j}(x)\tilde{\Gamma}_{e_{j}(x)}s(x) ,$$

where $\widetilde{\Gamma}$ is the spin connection, the lifting to S of the Levi-Civita connection on M. When M is n-euclidean space we return to the euclidean Dirac operator.

From an Atiyah–Singer–Dirac operator D we have the Lichnerowicz formula

$$D^{2}=\Gamma^{*}\Gamma+\tfrac{\tau}{4} ,$$

where τ is the scalar curvature on the manifold, and Γ^{∗} is the adjoint of Γ. The operator D^{2} is known as the spinorial Laplacian.

If M is compact and τ ≥ 0 and τ > 0 somewhere then there are no non-trivial harmonic spinors on the manifold. This is Lichnerowicz' theorem. It is readily seen that Lichnerowicz' theorem is a generalization of Liouville's theorem from one variable complex analysis. This allows us to note that over the space of smooth spinor sections on such a manifold the operator D is invertible.

In the cases where the Atiyah–Singer–Dirac operator is invertible on the space of smooth spinor sections with compact support one may introduce

$$C(x,y):=D^{-1}*\delta_{y}, \qquad x \neq y \in M,$$

where δ_{y} is the Dirac delta function evaluated at y. This gives rise to a Cauchy kernel, which is the fundamental solution to this Dirac operator. From this one may obtain a Cauchy integral formula for harmonic spinors. With this kernel much of what is described in the first section of this entry carries through for invertible Atiyah–Singer–Dirac operators.

Using Stokes' theorem, or otherwise, one can further determine that under a conformal change of metric the Dirac operators associated to each metric are proportional to each other, and consequently so are their inverses, if they exist.

All of this provides potential links to Atiyah–Singer index theory and other aspects of geometric analysis involving Dirac type operators.

== Hyperbolic Dirac type operators ==
In Clifford analysis one also considers differential operators on upper half space, the disc, or hyperbola with respect to the hyperbolic, or Poincaré metric.

For upper half space one splits the Clifford algebra, Cl_{n} into Cl_{n−1} + Cl_{n−1}e_{n}. So for a in Cl_{n} one may express a as b + ce_{n} with a, b in Cl_{n−1}. One then has projection operators P and Q defined as follows P(a) = b and Q(a) = c. The Hodge–Dirac operator acting on a function f with respect to the hyperbolic metric in upper half space is now defined to be

$$Mf=Df+\frac{n-2}{x_{n}}Q(f)$$.

In this case

$$M^{2}f=-\triangle_{n}P(f)+\frac{n-2}{x_{n}}\frac{\partial P(f)}{\partial x_{n}}- \left (\triangle_{n}Q(f)-\frac{n-2}{x_{n}}\frac{\partial Q(f)}{\partial x_{n}}+ \frac{n-2}{x_{n}^{2}}Q(f) \right )e_{n}$$.

The operator

$$\triangle_{n}-\frac{n-2}{x_{n}}\frac{\partial}{\partial x_{n}}$$

is the Laplacian with respect to the Poincaré metric while the other operator is an example of a Weinstein operator.

The hyperbolic Laplacian is invariant under actions of the conformal group, while the hyperbolic Dirac operator is covariant under such actions.

== Rarita–Schwinger/Stein–Weiss operators ==
Rarita–Schwinger operators, also known as Stein–Weiss operators, arise in representation theory for the Spin and Pin groups. The operator R_{k} is a conformally covariant first order differential operator. Here k = 0, 1, 2, .... When k = 0, the Rarita–Schwinger operator is just the Dirac operator. In representation theory for the orthogonal group, O(n) it is common to consider functions taking values in spaces of homogeneous harmonic polynomials. When one refines this representation theory to the double covering Pin(n) of O(n) one replaces spaces of homogeneous harmonic polynomials by spaces of k homogeneous polynomial solutions to the Dirac equation, otherwise known as k monogenic polynomials. One considers a function f(x, u) where x in U, a domain in R^{n}, and u varies over R^{n}. Further f(x, u) is a k-monogenic polynomial in u. Now apply the Dirac operator D_{x} in x to f(x, u). Now as the Clifford algebra is not commutative D_{x}f(x, u) then this function is no longer k monogenic but is a homogeneous harmonic polynomial in u. Now for each harmonic polynomial h_{k} homogeneous of degree k there is an Almansi–Fischer decomposition

$$h_{k}(x)=p_{k}(x)+xp_{k-1}(x)$$

where p_{k} and p_{k−1} are respectively k and k−1 monogenic polynomials. Let P be the projection of h_{k} to p_{k} then the Rarita–Schwinger operator is defined to be PD_{k}, and it is denoted by R_{k}. Using Euler's Lemma one may determine that

$$D_{u}up_{k-1}(u)=(-n-2k+2)p_{k-1}.$$

So

$$R_{k}=\left(I+\frac{1}{n+2k-2}uD_{u}\right)D_{x}.$$

== Conferences and Journals ==
There is a vibrant and interdisciplinary community around Clifford and Geometric Algebras with a wide range of applications. The main conferences in this subject include the International Conference on Clifford Algebras and their Applications in Mathematical Physics (ICCA) and Applications of Geometric Algebra in Computer Science and Engineering (AGACSE) series. A main publication outlet is the Springer journal Advances in Applied Clifford Algebras.

== See also ==
- Clifford algebra
- Complex spin structure
- Conformal manifold
- Conformally flat manifold
- Dirac operator
- Poincaré metric
- Spin group
- Spin structure
- Spinor bundle
