= Spinh group =

Twisted spin group

In spin geometry, a spin^{h} group (or quaternionic spin group) is a Lie group obtained by the spin group through twisting with the first symplectic group. H stands for the quaternions, which are denoted $\mathbb{H}$. An important application of spin^{h} groups is for spin^{h} structures.

== Definition ==
The spin group $\operatorname{Spin}(n)$ is a double cover of the special orthogonal group $\operatorname{SO}(n)$, hence $\mathbb{Z}_2$ acts on it with $\operatorname{Spin}(n)/\Z_2\cong\operatorname{SO}(n)$. Furthermore, $\mathbb{Z}_2$ also acts on the first symplectic group $\operatorname{Sp}(1)$ through the antipodal identification $y\sim -y$. The spin^{h} group is then:

$$\operatorname{Spin}^\mathrm{h}(n)
:=\left(
\operatorname{Spin}(n)\times\operatorname{Sp}(1)
\right)/\mathbb{Z}_2$$

mit $(x,y)\sim(-x,-y)$. It is also denoted $\operatorname{Spin}^\mathbb{H}(n)$. Using the exceptional isomorphism $\operatorname{Spin}(3) \cong\operatorname{Sp}(1)$, one also has $\operatorname{Spin}^\mathrm{h}(n) =\operatorname{Spin}^3(n)$ with:

$$\operatorname{Spin}^k(n)
:=\left(
\operatorname{Spin}(n)\times\operatorname{Spin}(k)
\right)/\mathbb{Z}_2.$$

== Low-dimensional examples ==
- $\operatorname{Spin}^\mathrm{h}(1) \cong\operatorname{Sp}(1) \cong\operatorname{SU}(2)$, induced by the isomorphism $\operatorname{Spin}(1) \cong\operatorname{O}(1) \cong\mathbb{Z}_2$
- $\operatorname{Spin}^\mathrm{h}(2) \cong\operatorname{U}(2)$, induced by the exceptional isomorphism $\operatorname{Spin}(2) \cong\operatorname{U}(1) \cong\operatorname{SO}(2)$- Since furthermore $\operatorname{Spin}(3) \cong\operatorname{Sp}(1) \cong\operatorname{SU}(2)$, one also has $\operatorname{Spin}^\mathrm{h}(2) \cong\operatorname{Spin}^\mathrm{c}(3)$.

== Properties ==
For all higher abelian homotopy groups, one has:

$$\pi_k\operatorname{Spin}^\mathrm{h}(n)
\cong\pi_k\operatorname{Spin}(n)\times\pi_k\operatorname{Sp}(1)
\cong\pi_k\operatorname{SO}(n)\times\pi_k(S^3)$$

for $k\geq 2$.

== See also ==
- Spin^{c} group

== Literature ==
- Christian Bär (1999). "Elliptic symbols". Mathematische Nachrichten. 201 (1).
