= Clifford module bundle =

In differential geometry, a Clifford module bundle, a bundle of Clifford modules or just Clifford module is a vector bundle whose fibers are Clifford modules, the representations of Clifford algebras. The canonical example is a spinor bundle. In fact, on a Spin manifold, every Clifford module is obtained by twisting the spinor bundle.

The notion "Clifford module bundle" should not be confused with a Clifford bundle, which is a bundle of Clifford algebras.

== Spinor bundles ==
Given an oriented Riemannian manifold M one can ask whether it is possible to construct a bundle of irreducible Clifford modules over Cℓ(T*M). In fact, such a bundle can be constructed if and only if M is a spin manifold.

Let M be an n-dimensional spin manifold with spin structure F_{Spin}(M) → F_{SO}(M) on M. Given any Cℓ_{n}R-module V one can construct the associated spinor bundle

$$S(M) = F_{\mathrm{Spin}}(M) \times_\sigma V\,$$

where σ : Spin(n) → GL(V) is the representation of Spin(n) given by left multiplication on S. Such a spinor bundle is said to be real, complex, graded or ungraded according to whether on not V has the corresponding property. Sections of S(M) are called spinors on M.

Given a spinor bundle S(M) there is a natural bundle map

$$C\ell(T^*M) \otimes S(M) \to S(M)$$

which is given by left multiplication on each fiber. The spinor bundle S(M) is therefore a bundle of Clifford modules over Cℓ(T*M).

== See also ==
- Orthonormal frame bundle
- Spin representation
- Spin geometry
