= Wu manifold =

In mathematics, the Wu manifold is a 5-manifold defined as a quotient space of Lie groups appearing in the mathematical area of Lie theory. Due to its special properties it is of interest in algebraic topology, cobordism theory and spin geometry. The manifold was first studied and named after Wu Wenjun.

== Definition ==
The special orthogonal group $\operatorname{SO}(n)$ embeds canonically in the special unitary group $\operatorname{SU}(n)$. The orbit space:

$$W:=\operatorname{SU}(3)/\operatorname{SO}(3)$$

is the Wu manifold.

== Properties ==
- $W$ is a simply connected rational homology sphere (with non-trivial homology groups $H_0(W)\cong\mathbb{Z}$, $H_2(W)\cong\mathbb{Z}_2$ and $H_5(W)\cong\mathbb{Z}$), which is not a sphere. Since in four or lower dimensions, every simply connected rational homology sphere is in fact a sphere, $W$ provides a counterexample of lowest possible dimension.
- $W$ has the cohomology groups:
  $$H^0(W;\mathbb{Z}_2)
=\mathbb{Z}_2$$
  $$H^1(W;\mathbb{Z}_2)
=1$$
  $$H^2(W;\mathbb{Z}_2)
=\mathbb{Z}_2$$
  $$H^3(W;\mathbb{Z}_2)
=\mathbb{Z}_2$$
  $$H^4(W;\mathbb{Z}_2)
=1$$
  $$H^5(W;\mathbb{Z}_2)
=\mathbb{Z}_2$$
- $W$ is a generator of the oriented cobordism group $\Omega_5^{\operatorname{SO}}\cong\mathbb{Z}_2$. This can be detected using the de Rham invariant, a particular Stiefel–Whitney number, which describes an isomorphism $w_2w_3\colon\Omega_5^\mathrm{SO}\rightarrow\mathbb{Z}_2$. Since the first Stiefel-Whitney class vanishes due to orientability, all other Stiefel-Whitney numbers automatically vanish. As a consequence, any orientable 5-manifold with non-vanishing de Rham invariant is orientable bordant to $W$, which for example includes the Dold manifold $P(2,1)=(S^1\times\mathbb{C}P^2)/\mathbb{Z}_2$. Both yield to each other under surgery for embeddings $S^2\times D^3\hookrightarrow W$ and $S^1\times D^4\hookrightarrow P(2,1)$ with common boundary $S^2\times S^3$. An oriented bordism is then given by the cartesian product of one manifold with the unit interval and then the corresponding surgery on one end.
- $W$ has a non-vanishing second and third Stiefel–Whitney class as well as a non-vanishing third integral Stiefel–Whitney class:
  $$w_2(W)\neq 0;$$
  $$w_3(W)\neq 0;$$
  $$W_3(W)\neq 0.$$
- $W$ can be immersed in $\mathbb{R}^8$, but not in $\mathbb{R}^7$. This is because all simply connected 5-manifolds can be immersed in $\mathbb{R}^8$ with the third integral Stiefel-Whitney class vanishing if and only if it can be reduced to $\mathbb{R}^7$ and the second Stiefel-Whitney class vanishing if and only if it can be further reduced to $\mathbb{R}^6$. Both isn't the case due to the previous property.
- $W$ is a spin^{h} manifold which doesn't allow a spin^{c} structure. The latter property comes from the fact that a spin^{c} structure implies a vanishing third Stiefel-Whitney class, which isn't the case here.

== Literature ==
- Barden, Dennis (1965). "Simply Connected Five-Manifolds" (PDF). Annals of Mathematics. 82 (3): 365–385. doi:10.2307/1970702.
