= Masters W65 10000 metres world record progression =

This is the progression of world record improvements of the 10000 metres W65 division of Masters athletics.

Key

Incomplete information Pending

Hand	Auto	Athlete	Nationality	Birthdate	Age	Location	Date
	39:57.40	Mariko Yugeta	Japan	13 May 1958	66 years, 13 days	Ageo	26 May 2024
	41:40.27	Angela Copson	Great Britain	20 April 1947	65 years, 107 days	Horspath	5 August 2012
	42:07.02	Theresia Baird	Australia	1 October 1941	65 years, 231 days	Collingwood	20 May 2007
	43:06.12	Marie-Louise Michelsohn	United States	8 October 1941	65 years, 181 days	Memphis	7 April 2007
	43:37.20	Rona Frederiks	Germany	7 January 1940	65 years, 120 days	Berlin	7 May 2005
44:20.9		Lieselotte Schulz	Germany	7 May 1920	65 years, 0 days	Verden	16 July 1985
