= Masters W65 5000 metres world record progression =

Progression of world record of the 5000 metres W65 division of Master athletics

This is the progression of world record improvements of the 5000 metres W65 division of Masters athletics.

Key

Incomplete information Pending

Hand	Auto	Athlete	Nationality	Birthdate	Age	Location	Date
	19:21.72	Mariko Yugeta	Japan	13 May 1958	65 years, 358 days	Ageo	5 May 2024
	19:51.73	Mariko Yugeta	Japan	13 May 1958	65 years, 148 days	Kawaguchi	8 October 2023
	20:08.17	Kathryn Martin	United States	30 September 1951	65 years, 28 days	Perth	28 October 2016
	20:10.09	Angela Copson	Great Britain	20 April 1947	66 years, 148 days	Birmingham	15 September 2013
	20:13.23	Angela Copson	Great Britain	20 April 1947	65 years, 93 days	Derby	22 July 2012
	20:27.08	Marie-Louise Michelsohn	United States	8 October 1941	65 years, 272 days	San Francisco	7 July 2007
	20:42.85	Theresia Baird	Australia	1 October 1941	65 years, 167 days	Melbourne	17 March 2007
	21:01.20	Brenda Riley	Australia	9 November 1939	66 years, 143 days	Melbourne	1 April 2006
	21:14.12	Rona Frederiks	Germany	7 January 1940	65 years, 156 days	Loewenberg	12 June 2005
	21:30.10	Melitta Czerwenka Nagel	Germany	30 April 1930	65 years, 14 days	Saarbrücken	14 May 1995
21:37.8		Jocelyn Ross	Great Britain	18 April 1928	65 years, 118 days	London	14 August 1993
	21:58.0	Lieselotte Schulz	Germany	7 May 1920	65 years, 56 days	Verden	2 July 1985
