= Pekonen =

Surname list

Pekonen is the surname of the following people

- Aino-Kaisa Pekonen (born 1979), Finnish politician
- Esa Pekonen (born 1961), Finnish footballer and manager
- Meeri Pekonen (born 1937), Finnish long track speed skater
- Osmo Pekonen (1960–2022), Finnish mathematician and author
