= Masters W70 5000 metres world record progression =

This is the progression of world record improvements of the 5000 metres W70 division of Masters athletics.

Key

Incomplete information Pending

Hand	Auto	Athlete	Nationality	Birthdate	Age	Location	Date
	20:56.13	Angela Copson	United Kingdom	20 April 1947	70 years, 66 days	Birmingham	25 June 2017
	21:34.09	Lavinia Petrie	Australia	13.09.1943	Hobart	09.03.2014	
	21:34.23	Lavinia Petrie	Australia	13.09.1943	Geelong	08.10.2013	
	21:59.96	Marie-Louise Michelsohn	United States	08.10.1941	New York	17.10.2011	
22:06.2		Cecilia Morrison	United Kingdom	27.06.1940	Portsmouth	12.07.2010	
	22:52.05	Elfriede Hodapp	Germany	15.06.1935	Vaterstetten	16.07.2005	
	22:55.39	Melitta Czerwenka Nagel	Germany	30.04.1930	Saarbrücken	19.05.2001	
23:21.2		Josie Edith Waller	United Kingdom	16.04.1922	Reading	04.10.1992	
	23:41.0	Johanna Luther	Germany	02.08.1913	Gross Gerau	07.09.1983	
