= F. Reese Harvey =

American mathematician (born 1941)

- Born: Frank Reese Harvey; 1941 (age 84–85)
- Education: Carnegie Mellon University (BS, MA, 1963); Stanford University (PhD, 1966)
- Known for: Calibrated geometry
- Scientific career
- Fields: Mathematics, Differential geometry
- Workplaces: Rice University
- Thesis: Hyperfunctions and Linear Partial Differential Equations (1966)
- Doctoral advisor: Hikosaburo Komatsu

Frank Reese Harvey (born 1941) is an American mathematician known for contributions to the field of differential geometry. In 1982, in collaboration with Blaine Lawson, Harvey introduced calibrated geometry, which is instrumental in the formulation of the SYZ conjecture. He is Edgar Odell Lovett Professor and professor emeritus of mathematics at Rice University,

== Education and career ==
Harvey graduated from Carnegie Mellon University in 1963 with both a bachelor's and master's degree. He obtained his Ph.D. from Stanford University in 1966, under the direction of Hikosaburo Komatsu.

He joined the Rice University faculty in 1968, and retired as Edgar Odell Lovett Professor in 2003.

== Recognition ==
In 1983 he was an invited speaker at the International Congress of Mathematicians in Warsaw. In 2024, he was elected to the United States National Academy of Sciences.

== Selected publications ==
- Harvey, Reese; Polking, John (1970). "Removable singularities of solutions of linear partial differential equations". Acta Mathematica. 125: 39–56. doi:10.1007/BF02838327. MR 0279461. Zbl 0214.10001.
- Harvey, F. Reese; Lawson, H. Blaine Jr. (1975). "On boundaries of complex analytic varieties. I". Annals of Mathematics. Second Series. 102 (2): 223–290. doi:10.2307/1971032. JSTOR 1971032. MR 0425173. Zbl 0317.32017.
- Harvey, Reese; Lawson, H. Blaine Jr. (1982). "Calibrated geometries". Acta Mathematica. 148: 47–157. doi:10.1007/BF02392726. MR 0666108. Zbl 0584.53021.
- Harvey, F. Reese (1990). Spinors and Calibrations. Perspectives in Mathematics. Vol. 9. Boston, MA: Academic Press. ISBN 0-12-329650-1. MR 1045637. Zbl 0694.53002.
