= Algebra bundle =

In mathematics, an algebra bundle is a fiber bundle whose fibers are algebras and local trivializations respect the algebra structure. It follows that the transition functions are algebra isomorphisms. Since algebras are also vector spaces, every algebra bundle is a vector bundle.

Examples include the tensor-algebra bundle, exterior bundle, and symmetric bundle associated to a given vector bundle, as well as the Clifford bundle associated to any Riemannian vector bundle.

== See also ==
- Lie algebra bundle
