= 5-manifold =

Manifold of dimension five

In mathematics, a 5-manifold is a 5-dimensional topological manifold, possibly with a piecewise linear or smooth structure.

Non-simply connected 5-manifolds are impossible to classify, as this is harder than solving the word problem for groups. Simply connected compact 5-manifolds were first classified by Stephen Smale and then in full generality by Dennis Barden, while another proof was later given by Aleksey V. Zhubr. This turns out to be easier than the 3- or 4-dimensional case: the 3-dimensional case is the Thurston geometrisation conjecture, and the 4-dimensional case was solved by Michael Freedman (1982) in the topological case, but is a very hard unsolved problem in the smooth case.

In dimension 5, the smooth classification of simply connected manifolds is governed by classical algebraic topology. Namely, two simply connected, smooth 5-manifolds are diffeomorphic if and only if there exists an isomorphism of their second homology groups with integer coefficients, preserving the linking form and the second Stiefel–Whitney class. Moreover, any such isomorphism in second homology is induced by some diffeomorphism. It is undecidable if a given 5-manifold is homeomorphic to $S^5$, the 5-sphere.

== Examples ==
Here are some examples of smooth, closed, simply connected 5-manifolds:

- $S^5$, the 5-sphere.
- $S^2\times S^3$, the product of a 2-sphere with a 3-sphere.
- $S^2\widetilde{\times} S^3$, the total space of the non-trivial $S^3$-bundle over $S^2$.
- $\operatorname{SU}(3)/\operatorname{SO}(3)$, the Wu manifold, the homogeneous space obtained as the quotient of the special unitary group SU(3) by the rotation subgroup SO(3).
