= Clifford module =

In mathematics, a Clifford module is a representation of a Clifford algebra. In general a Clifford algebra C is a central simple algebra over some field extension L of the field K over which the quadratic form Q defining C is defined.

The abstract theory of Clifford modules was founded by a paper of M. F. Atiyah, R. Bott and Arnold S. Shapiro. A fundamental result on Clifford modules is that the Morita equivalence class of a Clifford algebra (the equivalence class of the category of Clifford modules over it) depends only on the signature p − q (mod 8). This is an algebraic form of Bott periodicity.

== Matrix representations of real Clifford algebras ==
We will need to study anticommuting matrices (AB = −BA) because in Clifford algebras orthogonal vectors anticommute

$$A \cdot B = \frac{1}{2}( AB + BA ) = 0.$$

For the real Clifford algebra $\mathbb{R}_{p,q}$, we need p + q mutually anticommuting matrices, of which p have +1 as square and q have −1 as square.

$$\begin{matrix}
\gamma_a^2 &=& +1 &\mbox{if} &1 \le a \le p \\
\gamma_a^2 &=& -1 &\mbox{if} &p+1 \le a \le p+q\\
\gamma_a \gamma_b &=& -\gamma_b \gamma_a &\mbox{if} &a \ne b. \ \\
\end{matrix}$$

Such a basis of gamma matrices is not unique. One can always obtain another set of gamma matrices satisfying the same Clifford algebra by means of a similarity transformation.

$$\gamma_{a'} = S \gamma_{a} S^{-1} ,$$

where S is a non-singular matrix. The sets γ_{a′} and γ_{a} belong to the same equivalence class.

== Real Clifford algebra R_{3,1} ==
Developed by Ettore Majorana, this Clifford module enables the construction of a Dirac-like equation without complex numbers, and its elements are called Majorana spinors.

The four basis vectors are the three Pauli matrices and a fourth antihermitian matrix. The signature is (+++−). For the signatures (+−−−) and (−−−+) often used in physics, 4×4 complex matrices or 8×8 real matrices are needed.

== See also ==
- Weyl–Brauer matrices
- Higher-dimensional gamma matrices
- Clifford module bundle
