= Dirac operator =

First-order differential linear operator on spinor bundle, whose square is the Laplacian

In mathematics and in quantum mechanics, a Dirac operator is a first-order differential operator that is a formal square root, or half-iterate, of a second-order differential operator such as a Laplacian. It was introduced in 1847 by William Hamilton and in 1928 by Paul Dirac. The question which concerned Dirac was to factorise formally the Laplace operator of the Minkowski space, to get an equation for the wave function which would be compatible with special relativity.

== Formal definition ==
In general, let $D$ be a first-order differential operator acting on a vector bundle $V$ over a Riemannian manifold $M$. If
$$D^2=\Delta, \,$$
where $\Delta$ is the (positive, or geometric) Laplacian of $V$, then $D$ is called a Dirac operator.

Note that there are two different conventions as to how the Laplace operator is defined:

- the "analytic" Laplacian, which could be characterized in $\R^n$ as
  $$\Delta=\nabla^2=\sum_{j=1}^n\left(\frac{\partial}{\partial x_j}\right)^2 {,}$$
  which is negative-definite, in the sense that $\int_{\R^n}\overline{\varphi(x)}\Delta\varphi(x)\,dx=-\int_{\R^n}|\nabla\varphi(x)|^2\,dx<0$ for any smooth compactly supported function $\varphi(x)$ which is not identically zero, and
- the "geometric", positive-definite Laplacian defined by
  $$\Delta=-\nabla^2=-\sum_{j=1}^n\left(\frac{\partial}{\partial x_j}\right)^2 {.}$$

== History ==
W.R. Hamilton defined "the square root of the Laplacian" in 1847 in his series of articles about quaternions:

<...> if we introduce a new characteristic of operation, $\triangleleft$, defined with relation to these three symbols $ijk,$ and to the known operation of partial differentiation, performed with respect to three independent but real variables $xyz,$ as follows:
$$\triangleleft=\frac{i\mathrm{d}}{\mathrm{d}x}+\frac{j\mathrm{d}}{\mathrm{d}y}+\frac{k\mathrm{d}}{\mathrm{d}z};$$
this new characteristic $\triangleleft$ will have the negative of its symbolic square expressed by the following formula :
$$-\triangleleft^2=\left(\frac{\mathrm{d}}{\mathrm{d}x}\right)^2+\left(\frac{\mathrm{d}}{\mathrm{d}y}\right)^2+\left(\frac{\mathrm{d}}{\mathrm{d}z}\right)^2;$$
of which it is clear that the applications to analytical physics must be extensive in a high degree.

== Examples ==
=== Example 1 ===
$D = -i \partial_x$ is a Dirac operator on the tangent bundle over a line.

=== Example 2 ===
Consider a simple bundle of notable importance in physics: the configuration space of a particle with spin–1/2 confined to a plane, which is also the base manifold. It is represented by a wavefunction $\psi : \mathbb{R}^2 \to \mathbb{C}^2$

$$\psi(x,y) = \begin{bmatrix}\chi(x,y) \\ \eta(x,y)\end{bmatrix}$$

where $x$ and $y$ are the usual coordinate functions on $\mathbb{R}^2$. $\chi$ specifies the probability amplitude for the particle to be in the spin-up state, and similarly for $\eta$. The so-called spin-Dirac operator can then be written

$$D=-i\sigma_x\partial_x-i\sigma_y\partial_y ,$$

where $\sigma_i$ are the Pauli matrices. Note that the anticommutation relations for the Pauli matrices make the proof of the above defining property trivial. Those relations define the notion of a Clifford algebra.

Solutions to the Dirac equation for spinor fields are often called harmonic spinors.

=== Example 3 ===
Feynman's Dirac operator describes the propagation of a free fermion in three dimensions and is elegantly written

$$D=\gamma^\mu\partial_\mu\ \equiv \partial\!\!\!/,$$

using the Feynman slash notation. In introductory textbooks to quantum field theory, this will appear in the form

$$D = c\vec\alpha \cdot (-i\hbar\nabla_x) + mc^2\beta$$

where $\vec\alpha = (\alpha_1, \alpha_2, \alpha_3)$ are the off-diagonal Dirac matrices $\alpha_i=\beta\gamma_i$, with $\beta=\gamma_0$ and the remaining constants are $c$ the speed of light, $\hbar$ being the Planck constant, and $m$ the mass of a fermion (for example, an electron). It acts on a four-component wave function $\psi(x) \in L^2(\mathbb{R}^3, \mathbb{C}^4)$, the Sobolev space of smooth, square-integrable functions. It can be extended to a self-adjoint operator on that domain. The square, in this case, is not the Laplacian, but instead $D^2=\Delta+m^2$ (after setting $\hbar=c=1.$)

=== Example 4 ===
Another Dirac operator arises in Clifford analysis. In euclidean $n$-space this is

$$D=\sum_{j=1}^{n}e_{j}\frac{\partial}{\partial x_{j}}$$

where $\{ e_j \}_{j = 1}^{n}$ is an orthonormal basis for euclidean $n$-space, and $\mathbb{R}^n$ is considered to be embedded in a Clifford algebra.

This is a special case of the Atiyah–Singer–Dirac operator acting on sections of a spinor bundle.

=== Example 5 ===
For a spin manifold, M, the Atiyah–Singer–Dirac operator is locally defined as follows: For x ∈ M and e_{1}(x), ..., e_{j}(x) a local orthonormal basis for the tangent space of M at x, the Atiyah–Singer–Dirac operator is

$$D=\sum_{j=1}^{n}e_{j}(x)\tilde{\Gamma}_{e_{j}(x)} ,$$

where $\tilde{\Gamma}$ is the spin connection, a lifting of the Levi-Civita connection on M to the spinor bundle over M. The square in this case is not the Laplacian, but instead $D^2=\Delta+R/4$ where $R$ is the scalar curvature of the connection.

=== Example 6 ===
On Riemannian manifold $(M, g)$ of dimension $n=\dim(M)$ with Levi-Civita connection $\nabla$ and an orthonormal basis $\{e_{a}\}_{a=1}^{n} {,}$ we can define exterior derivative $d$ and coderivative $\delta$ as

$$d = e^{a}\wedge \nabla_{e_{a}}, \quad \delta = e^{a} \lrcorner \nabla_{e_{a}}$$.

Then we can define a Dirac-Kähler operator $D$, as follows

$$D = e^{a}\nabla_{e_{a}}=d-\delta$$.

The operator acts on sections of Clifford bundle in general, and it can be restricted to spinor bundle, an ideal of Clifford bundle, only if the projection operator on the ideal is parallel.

== Generalisations ==
In Clifford analysis, the operator D : C^{∞}(R^{k} ⊗ R^{n}, S) → C^{∞}(R^{k} ⊗ R^{n}, C^{k} ⊗ S) acting on spinor valued functions defined by

$$f(x_1,\ldots,x_k)\mapsto
\begin{pmatrix}
\partial_{\underline{x_1}}f\\
\partial_{\underline{x_2}}f\\
\ldots\\
\partial_{\underline{x_k}}f\\
\end{pmatrix}$$

is sometimes called Dirac operator in k Clifford variables. In the notation, S is the space of spinors, $x_i=(x_{i1},x_{i2},\ldots,x_{in})$ are n-dimensional variables and $\partial_{\underline{x_i}}=\sum_j e_j\cdot \partial_{x_{ij}}$ is the Dirac operator in the i-th variable. This is a common generalization of the Dirac operator (k = 1) and the Dolbeault operator (n = 2, k arbitrary). It is an invariant differential operator, invariant under the action of the group SL(k) × Spin(n). The resolution of D is known only in some special cases.

== See also ==
- Nabla symbol and Del
- AKNS hierarchy
- Dirac equation
- Clifford algebra
- Clifford analysis
- Connection
- Dolbeault operator
- Heat kernel
- Spinor bundle
