= Jean-Pierre Bourguignon =

French mathematician (born 1947)

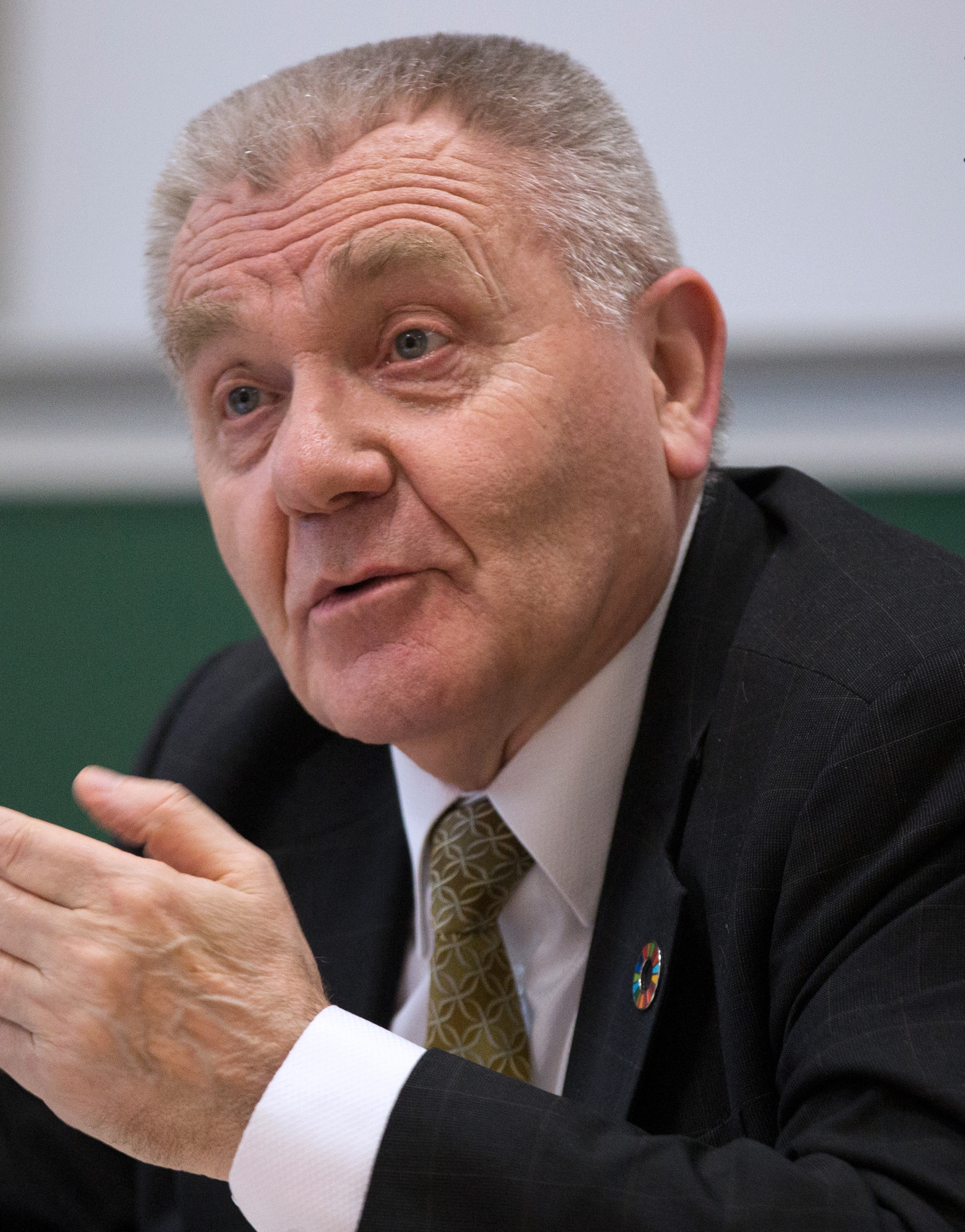
- Jean-Pierre Bourguignon in 2017.
- Born: 21 July 1947 (age 79); Lyon, France
- Education: École Polytechnique; Paris Diderot University
- Scientific career
- Fields: Mathematics
- Workplaces: École Polytechnique
- Doctoral advisor: Marcel Berger
- Doctoral students: Denis Auroux; Osmo Pekonen

Jean-Pierre Bourguignon (born 21 July 1947) is a French mathematician, working in the field of differential geometry.

== Biography ==
Born in Lyon, France, he studied at École Polytechnique in Palaiseau, graduating in 1969. For his graduate studies he went to Paris Diderot University, where he obtained his PhD in 1974 under the direction of Marcel Berger.

He was president of the Société Mathématique de France from 1990 to 1992. From 1995 to 1998, he was president of the European Mathematical Society. He was director of the Institut des Hautes Études Scientifiques near Paris from 1994 to 2013. Between 1 January 2014 and 31 December 2019 he was the President of the European Research Council.

Prof. Bourguignon received the Prix Paul Langevin in 1987 and the Prix du Rayonnement Français in Mathematical Sciences and Physics from the Académie des Sciences de Paris in 1997. He is a foreign member of the Royal Spanish Academy of Sciences. In 2005, he was elected honorary member of the London Mathematical Society and has been the secretary of the mathematics section of the Academia Europaea.

He was elected a Fellow of the Royal Society in 2026.

== Selected publications ==
=== Articles ===
- Bourguignon, Jean-Pierre; Brezis, Haïm (1974). "Remarks on the Euler equation". Journal of Functional Analysis. 15 (4): 341–363. doi:10.1016/0022-1236(74)90027-5. MR 0344713.
- with H. Blaine Lawson and James Simons: Bourguignon, J.-P.; Lawson, H. B.; Simons, J. (1979). "Stability and gap phenomena for Yang-Mills fields". Proceedings of the National Academy of Sciences. 76 (4): 1550–1553. Bibcode:1979PNAS...76.1550B. doi:10.1073/pnas.76.4.1550. PMC 383426. PMID 16592637.
- with H. Blaine Lawson: Bourguignon, Jean-Pierre; Lawson, H. Blaine (1981). "Stability and isolation phenomena for Yang-Mills fields". Communications in Mathematical Physics. 79 (2): 189–230. Bibcode:1981CMaPh..79..189B. doi:10.1007/BF01942061. S2CID 121935427.
- with Jean-Pierre Ezin: Bourguignon, Jean-Pierre; Ezin, Jean-Pierre (1987). "Scalar curvature functions in a conformal class of metrics and conformal transformations". Transactions of the American Mathematical Society. 301 (2): 723–736. doi:10.1090/S0002-9947-1987-0882712-7.

=== Books ===
- Bourguignon, Jean-Pierre (2007). Calcul variationnel (in French). Palaiseau: Éditions de l'École Polytechnique. 328 pages. ISBN 978-2-7302-1415-5. MR 2490159.
- with Oussama Hijazi, Jean-Louis Milhorat, Andrei Moroianu and Sergiu Moroianu: A Spinorial Approach to Riemannian and Conformal Geometry. European Mathematical Society. 2015. ISBN 978-3-03719-136-1.
- as editor with Rolf Jeltsch, Alberto Adrego Pinto, and Marcelo Viana: Dynamics, Games and Science: International Conference and Advanced School Planet Earth, DGS II, Portugal, August 28–September 6, 2013. Springer. 24 July 2015. ISBN 978-3-319-16118-1.
