= Clifford bundle =

In mathematics, a Clifford bundle is an algebra bundle whose fibers have the structure of a Clifford algebra and whose local trivializations respect the algebra structure. There is a natural Clifford bundle associated to any (pseudo) Riemannian manifold M which is called the Clifford bundle of M.

This is commonly referred to as the Hopf fibration of S^{3}, a topological construction pointed out by Heinz Hopf (1931). But Hopf’s procedure was explicitly based (with due reference) on an earlier geometrical construction of ‘Clifford parallels’.

== General construction ==
Let V be a (real or complex) vector space together with a symmetric bilinear form <·,·>. The Clifford algebra Cℓ(V) is a natural (unital associative) algebra generated by V subject only to the relation

$$v^2 = \langle v,v\rangle$$

for all v in V. One can construct Cℓ(V) as a quotient of the tensor algebra of V by the ideal generated by the above relation.

Like other tensor operations, this construction can be carried out fiberwise on a smooth vector bundle. Let E be a smooth vector bundle over a smooth manifold M, and let g be a smooth symmetric bilinear form on E. The Clifford bundle of E is the fiber bundle whose fibers are the Clifford algebras generated by the fibers of E:

$$C\ell(E) = \coprod_{x\in M} C\ell(E_x,g_x)$$

The topology of Cℓ(E) is determined by that of E via an associated bundle construction.

One is most often interested in the case where g is positive-definite or at least nondegenerate; that is, when (E, g) is a Riemannian or pseudo-Riemannian vector bundle. For concreteness, suppose that (E, g) is a Riemannian vector bundle. The Clifford bundle of E can be constructed as follows. Let Cℓ_{n}R be the Clifford algebra generated by R^{n} with the Euclidean metric. The standard action of the orthogonal group O(n) on R^{n} induces a graded automorphism of Cℓ_{n}R. The homomorphism

$$\rho : \mathrm O(n) \to \mathrm{Aut}(C\ell_n\mathbb R)$$

is determined by

$$\rho(A)(v_1v_2\cdots v_k) = (Av_1)(Av_2)\cdots(Av_k)$$

where v_{i} are all vectors in R^{n}. The Clifford bundle of E is then given by

$$C\ell(E) = F(E) \times_\rho C\ell_n\mathbb R$$

where F(E) is the orthonormal frame bundle of E. It is clear from this construction that the structure group of Cℓ(E) is O(n). Since O(n) acts by graded automorphisms on Cℓ_{n}R it follows that Cℓ(E) is a bundle of Z_{2}-graded algebras over M. The Clifford bundle Cℓ(E) can then be decomposed into even and odd subbundles:

$$C\ell(E)  = C\ell^0(E) \oplus C\ell^1(E).$$

If the vector bundle E is orientable then one can reduce the structure group of Cℓ(E) from O(n) to SO(n) in the natural manner.

== Clifford bundle of a Riemannian manifold ==
If M is a Riemannian manifold with metric g, then the Clifford bundle of M is the Clifford bundle generated by the tangent bundle TM. One can also build a Clifford bundle out of the cotangent bundle T*M. The metric induces a natural isomorphism TM = T*M and therefore an isomorphism Cℓ(TM) = Cℓ(T*M).

There is a natural vector bundle isomorphism between the Clifford bundle of M and the exterior bundle of M:

$$C\ell(T^*M) \cong \Lambda(T^*M).$$

This is an isomorphism of vector bundles not algebra bundles. The isomorphism is induced from the corresponding isomorphism on each fiber. In this way one can think of sections of the Clifford bundle as differential forms on M equipped with Clifford multiplication rather than the wedge product (which is independent of the metric).

The above isomorphism respects the grading in the sense that

$$\begin{align}
C\ell^0(T^*M) &= \Lambda^{\mathrm{even}}(T^*M)\\
C\ell^1(T^*M) &= \Lambda^{\mathrm{odd}}(T^*M).
\end{align}$$

=== Local description ===
For a vector $v \in T_{x}M$ at $x\in M$, and a form $\psi \in \Lambda(T_{x}M)$ the Clifford multiplication is defined as

$v\psi= v\wedge \psi + v \lrcorner \psi$,

where the metric duality to change vector to the one form is used in the first term.

Then the exterior derivative $d$ and coderivative $\delta$ can be related to the metric connection $\nabla$ using the choice of an orthonormal base $\{ e_{a}\}$ by

$d=e^{a}\wedge \nabla_{e_a}, \quad \delta = -e^{a}\lrcorner\nabla_{e_a}$.

Using these definitions, the Dirac-Kähler operator is defined by

$D = e^{a}\nabla_{e_a}=d-\delta$.

On a star domain the operator can be inverted using Poincaré lemma for exterior derivative and its Hodge star dual for coderivative. Practical way of doing this is by homotopy and cohomotopy operators.

== See also ==
- Orthonormal frame bundle
- Spinor
- Spin manifold
- Spinor representation
- Spin geometry
- Spin structure
- Clifford module bundle
