= Lie algebra bundle =

Concept in topology (mathematics)

In mathematics, a weak Lie algebra bundle

$$\xi=(\xi, p, X, \theta)\,$$

is a vector bundle $\xi\,$ over a base space X together with a morphism

$$\theta : \xi \otimes \xi \rightarrow \xi$$

which induces a Lie algebra structure on each fibre $\xi_x\,$.

A Lie algebra bundle $\xi=(\xi, p, X)\,$ is a vector bundle in which each fibre is a Lie algebra and for every x in X, there is an open set $U$ containing x, a Lie algebra L and a homeomorphism

$$\phi:U\times L\to p^{-1}(U)\,$$

such that

$$\phi_x:\{x\}\times L \rightarrow p^{-1}(\{x\})\,$$

is a Lie algebra isomorphism.

Any Lie algebra bundle is a weak Lie algebra bundle, but the converse need not be true in general.

As an example of a weak Lie algebra bundle that is not a strong Lie algebra bundle, consider the total space $\mathfrak{so}(3)\times\mathbb{R}$ over the real line $\mathbb{R}$. Let [.,.] denote the Lie bracket of $\mathfrak{so}(3)$ and deform it by the real parameter as:

$$[X,Y]_x = x\cdot[X,Y]$$

for $X,Y\in\mathfrak{so}(3)$ and $x\in\mathbb{R}$.

Lie's third theorem states that every bundle of Lie algebras can locally be integrated to a bundle of Lie groups. In general globally the total space might fail to be Hausdorff. But if all fibres of a real Lie algebra bundle over a topological space are mutually isomorphic as Lie algebras, then it is a locally trivial Lie algebra bundle. This result was proved by proving that the real orbit of a real point under an algebraic group is open in the real part of its complex orbit. Suppose the base space is Hausdorff and fibers of total space are isomorphic as Lie algebras then there exists a Hausdorff Lie group bundle over the same base space whose Lie algebra bundle is isomorphic to the given Lie algebra bundle. Every semi simple Lie algebra bundle is locally trivial. Hence there exist a Hausdorff Lie group bundle over the same base space whose Lie algebra bundle is isomorphic to the given Lie algebra bundle.

== See also ==
- Algebra bundle
- Adjoint bundle
