= Dennis Barden =

British mathematician

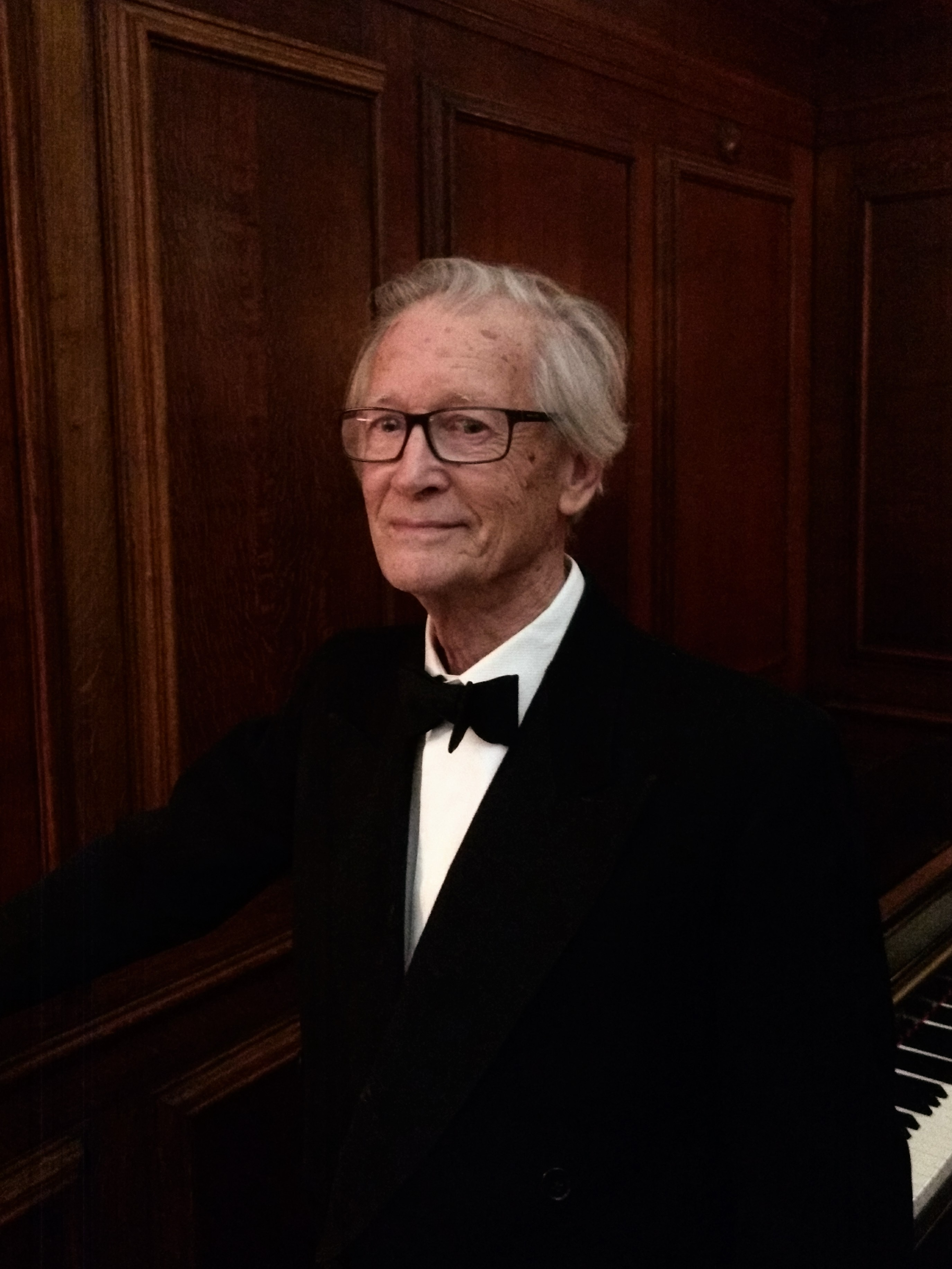
- Dennis Barden at the Pembroke Mathematicians' Dinner 2018
- Born: 2 March 1936 (age 90); Kingswood, Surrey, UK
- Citizenship: British
- Education: University of Cambridge
- Scientific career
- Fields: Geometry, Topology
- Workplaces: DPMMS, University of Cambridge
- Thesis: On the structure and classification of differential manifolds (1964)
- Doctoral advisor: C. T. C. Wall

Dennis Barden is a mathematician at the University of Cambridge working in the fields of geometry and topology. He is known for his classification of the simply connected compact 5-manifolds and, together with Barry Mazur and John R. Stallings, for having proved the s-cobordism theorem. Barden received his Ph.D. from Cambridge in 1964 under the supervision of C. T. C. Wall.

== Academic Positions ==
Barden is a Life Fellow of Girton College, Cambridge and emeritus fellow of Pembroke College. In 1991, he became Director of Studies for mathematics at Pembroke College, succeeding Raymond Lickorish. He held the position until Michaelmas 2003, and in his time saw a great increase in the number of applicants for mathematics, with consistently high performances in Tripos exams. He remains an active supervisor at Pembroke and Girton College.

== Selected publications ==
- Barden, Dennis; Thomas, Charles (2003), An introduction to differential manifolds, London: Imperial College Press, doi:10.1142/p285, ISBN 1-86094-354-3, MR 1992457
- Barden, D. (1965), "Simply connected five-manifolds", Annals of Mathematics, Second Series, 82 (3): 365–385, doi:10.2307/1970702, JSTOR 1970702, MR 0184241
