= Osmo Pekonen =

Finnish mathematician (1960–2022)

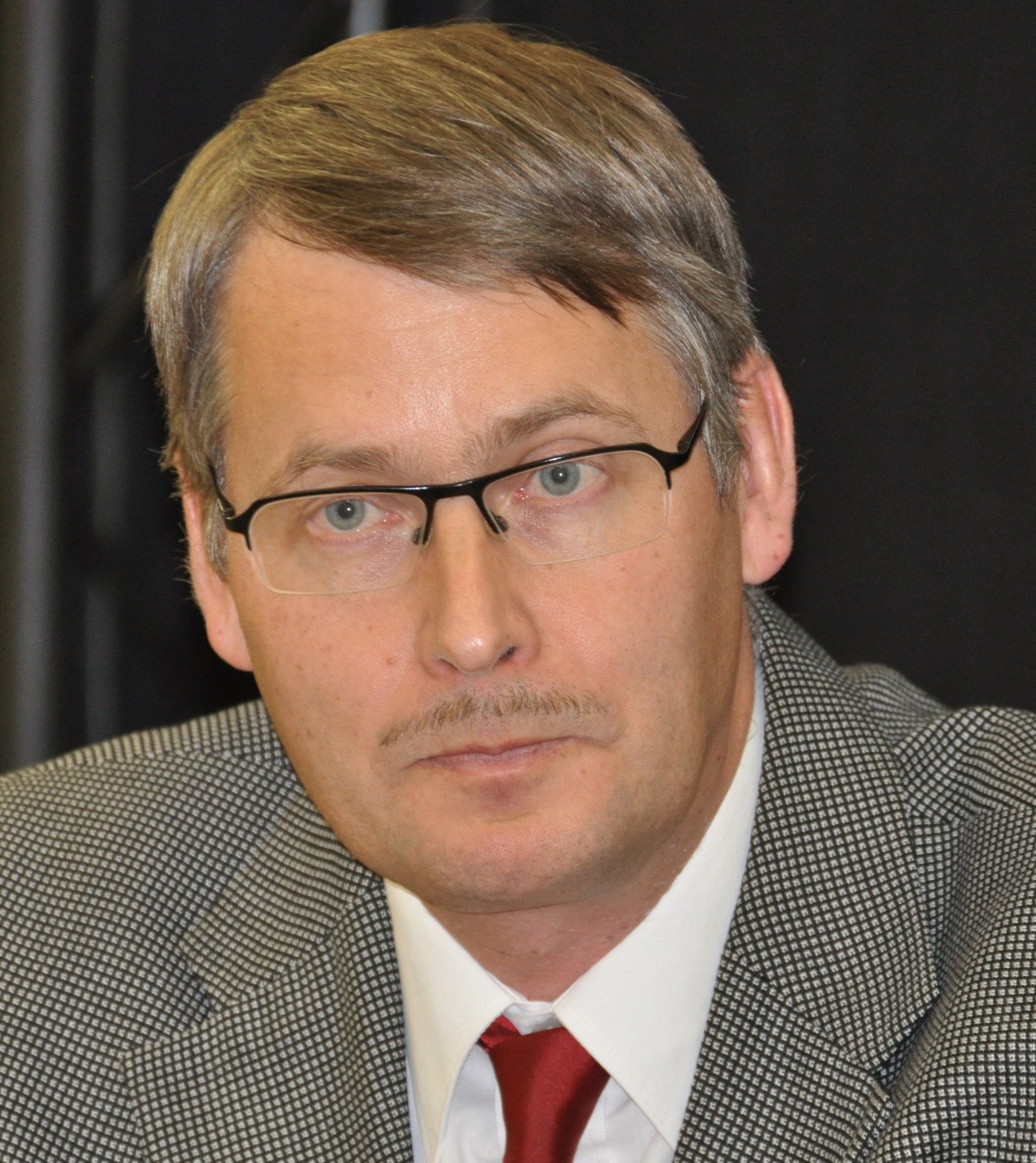
- Pekonen in 2012
- Born: 2 April 1960; Mikkeli, Finland
- Died: 12 October 2022 (aged 62); Uzès, France
- Education: University of Jyväskylä; University of Lapland
- Scientific career
- Fields: Mathematics, History of Science
- Workplaces: University of Jyväskylä; University of Helsinki
- Doctoral advisors: 1st thesis: Jean-Pierre Bourguignon and Max Karoubi 2nd thesis: Seppo Aho and Juha Pentikäinen

Osmo Pekonen (2 April 1960 – 12 October 2022) was a Finnish mathematician, historian of science, and author. He was a docent of mathematics at the University of Helsinki and at the University of Jyväskylä, a docent of history of science at the University of Oulu, and a docent of history of civilization at the University of Lapland. He was the Book Reviews section editor of The Mathematical Intelligencer.

== Personal life and death ==
Pekonen died suddenly in his sleep on 12 October 2022, at the age of 62, in Uzès, France during a bicycle tour.

== Honours and distinctions ==
Osmo Pekonen was a corresponding member of four French academies; these are: Académie des sciences, arts et belles-lettres de Caen (founded in 1652), Académie des sciences, belles-lettres et arts de Besançon et de Franche-Comté (founded in 1752), Académie d'Orléans (founded in 1809) and Académie européenne des sciences, des arts et des lettres (founded in 1979).

In 2012, he was awarded the Prix Chaix d'Est-Ange of the Académie des sciences morales et politiques in the field of history.

== Bibliography ==
=== Doctoral theses ===
- Contributions to and a survey on moduli spaces of differential geometric structures with applications in physics, PhD thesis, University of Jyväskylä, 1988
- La rencontre des religions autour du voyage de l'abbé Réginald Outhier en Suède en 1736-1737, D.Soc.Sci thesis, Rovaniemi: Lapland University Press, 2010

=== Monographies and edited volumes ===
- Topological and Geometrical Methods in Field Theory, Osmo Pekonen & Jouko Mickelsson (eds.), Singapore: World Scientific, 1992
- Symbolien metsässä: Matemaattisia esseitä, Osmo Pekonen (ed.), Helsinki: Art House, 1992
- Ranskan tiede: Kuuluisia kouluja ja instituutioita, Helsinki: Art House, 1995
- Marian maa. Lasse Heikkilän elämä 1925–1961, Helsinki: SKS, 2002
- Osmo Pekonen & Lea Pulkkinen: Sosiaalinen pääoma ja tieto- ja viestintätekniikan kehitys, Helsinki: The Parliament of Finland, Committee for the Future, 2002
- Suomalaisen modernin lyriikan synty. Juhlakirja 75-vuotiaalle Lassi Nummelle, Osmo Pekonen (ed.), Kuopio: Snellman-instituutti, 2005
- Porrassalmi. Etelä-Savon kulttuurin vuosikirja (ten volumes, I-X), Jorma Julkunen, Jutta Julkunen & Osmo Pekonen et alia (eds.) Mikkeli: Savon Sotilasperinneyhdistys Porrassalmi ry, 2008-2017
- Lapin tuhat tarinaa. Anto Leikolan juhlakirja, Osmo Pekonen & Johan Stén (eds.), Ranua: Mäntykustannus, 2012
- Salaperäinen Venus, Ranua: Mäntykustannus, 2012
- Maupertuis en Laponie, with Anouchka Vasak, Paris: Hermann, 2014
- Maan muoto, with Marja Itkonen-Kaila, Tornio: Väylä, 2019
- Markkasen galaksit. Tapio Markkanen in memoriam, edited with Johan Stén, Helsinki: Ursa, 2019
- Valon aika, with Johan Stén, Helsinki: Art House, 2019
- Pohjan Tornio. Matkamiesten ääniä vuosisatain varrelta 1519-1919, Rovaniemi: Väylä, 2022

=== Essay collections ===
- Danse macabre: Eurooppalaisen matkakirja, Jyväskylä: Atena, 1994
- Tuhat vuotta, Helsinki: WSOY, 1998
- Minä ja Dolly: Kolumneja, esseitä, runoja, Jyväskylä: Atena, 1999
- Oodi ilolle: Matkoja, maita, kaupunkeja, Turku: Enostone, 2010
- Joka paikan akateemikko, Turku: Enostone, 2012

=== Edited essay collections ===
- Elämän puu, illustrated by Martti Ruokonen, Helsinki: WSOY, 1997
- Elämän värit, graphic design by Jussi Jäppinen, Jyväskylä: Kopijyvä, 2003
- Elämän vuodenajat, photographs by Seppo Nykänen, Jyväskylä: Minerva, 2005

=== Edited poem collections ===
- Lasse Heikkilä: Balladi Ihantalasta. Runoja kesästä 1944, Osmo Pekonen (ed.), Helsinki & Jyväskylä: Kopijyvä/Minerva, 1999, 2007, 2016
- Charles Péguy: Chartres’n tie: Charles Péguy’n runoja, translated by Anna-Maija Raittila et alia, Osmo Pekonen (ed.), Jyväskylä: Minerva, 2003

=== Diaries ===
- Saint-Malosta Sääksmäelle. Päiväkirjastani 2014-2015, Tampere: Enostone, 2015
- Minäkin Arkadiassa. Päiväkirjastani 2016-2017. Tampere: Enostone, 2017
- Unikukkia, ulpukoita. Päiväkirjastani 2018-2019. Rovaniemi: Väylä, 2019

=== Prose translations ===
- Philippe Quéau: Lumetodellisuus (Le virtuel: Vertus et vertiges, 1993), translated into Finnish by Osmo Pekonen, Helsinki: Art House, 1995
- Alexei Sossinsky: Solmut: Erään matemaattisen teorian synty (Nœuds: Genèse d’une théorie mathématique, 1999), translated into Finnish by Osmo Pekonen, Helsinki: Art House, 2002
- Bo Lindberg: Latina ja Eurooppa (Europa och latinet, 1993), translated into Finnish by Osmo Pekonen, Jyväskylä: Atena, 1997 (2nd edition 2009)
- Peter Kravanja: Visconti, Proustin lukija (Visconti, lecteur de Proust, 2004), translated into Finnish by Osmo Pekonen, Jyväskylä & Helsinki: Minerva, 2006
- Mary Terrall: Maupertuis, maapallon muodon mittaaja (The Man Who Flattened the Earth. Maupertuis and the Sciences in the Enlightenment, 2002), translated into Finnish by Osmo Pekonen, Tornio: Väylä, 2015
- Émilie du Châtelet: Tutkielma onnesta (Discours sur le bonheur), translated into Finnish by Osmo Pekonen, Kuopio: Hai, 2016
- Pierre Louis Moreau de Maupertuis: Fyysinen Venus (Vénus physique, 1745), translated into Finnish by Osmo Pekonen, Helsinki: Art House, 2017
- Roger Picard: Salonkien aika (Les salons littéraires et la société française 1610–1789, New York 1943), translated into Finnish by Osmo Pekonen & Juhani Sarkava, Helsinki: Art House, 2018
- Francis Godwin: Lento kuuhun (The Man in the Moone, London 1638), translated into Finnish by Osmo Pekonen, Helsinki: Basam Books, 2021

=== Translations of ancient poetry ===
- Beowulf, translation into Finnish and commentaries by Osmo Pekonen & Clive Tolley, Helsinki: WSOY, 1999. Second edition: WSOY 2007
- Widsith: Anglosaksinen muinaisruno, translation into Finnish and commentaries by Osmo Pekonen & Clive Tolley, Jyväskylä: Minerva, 2004
- Waldere: Anglosaksinen muinaisruno, translation into Finnish and commentaries by Jonathan Himes, Osmo Pekonen & Clive Tolley, Jyväskylä: Minerva, 2005
- Gustav Philip Creutz: Atis ja Camilla (Atis och Camilla, 1761), translated into Finnish by Osmo Pekonen, Turku: Faros, 2019

=== Books with a preface by Osmo Pekonen ===
- Ivar Ekeland: Paras mahdollisista maailmoista (Le meilleur des mondes possibles, 2000), translated into Finnish by Susanna Maaranen, Helsinki: Art House, 2004
- Réginald Outhier: Matka Pohjan perille (Journal d'un voyage au Nord, 1744), translated into Finnish by Marja Itkonen-Kaila, Rovaniemi: Väylä, 2011
- Jean-François Regnard: Retki Lappiin (Voyage de Laponie, 1731), translated into Finnish by Marja Itkonen-Kaila, Rovaniemi: Väylä, 2012
- Lassi Nummi: Le jardin de la vie, a selection of poems translated into French by Yves Avril, Orléans: Paradigme, 2015
- Auli Särkiö: Sarmatie (Sarmatia, 2011), translated into French by Yves Avril, Mont de Laval: Grand Tétras, 2015
- Eino Leino: "Doch ein Lied steht über allen...", a selection of poems translated into German by Manfred Stern, Hamburg: Verlag Dr. Kovač, 2017
- Voltaire: Mikromegas. Filosofinen kertomus (Micromégas: histoire philosophique, 1752), translated into Finnish by Marja Haapio, Helsinki: Basam Books, 2019
