= H. Blaine Lawson =

American mathematician (born 1942)

H. Blaine Lawson, Jr.
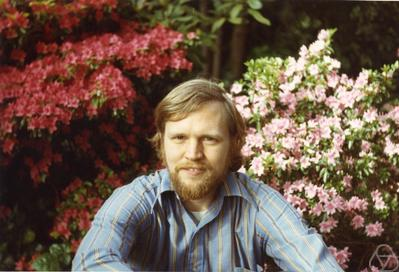
- H. Blaine Lawson in Berkeley, 1972
- Born: January 4, 1942 (age 84); Norristown, Pennsylvania, U.S.
- Citizenship: United States
- Scientific career
- Doctoral advisor: Robert Osserman

Herbert Blaine Lawson Jr. is an American mathematician known for his work in minimal surfaces, calibrated geometry, algebraic cycles, foliations, several complex variables, Riemannian geometry, and partial differential equations. He is currently a Distinguished Professor of Mathematics at Stony Brook University.

Lawson completed his undergraduate studies at Brown University in 1964, earning degrees in both applied mathematics and Russian literature. He received his PhD from Stanford University in 1969, where he worked under the supervision of Robert Osserman.

After completing his doctorate, Lawson joined the faculty at the University of California, Berkeley. He rose to the rank of full professor before moving to Stony Brook University in 1978, where he has remained.

Lawson has held extended visiting positions at several international research institutes. These include the Institute for Advanced Study in Princeton, the Institut des Hautes Études Scientifiques (IHÉS) near Paris, the Instituto de Matemática Pura e Aplicada (IMPA) in Rio de Janeiro, the Research Institute for Mathematical Sciences (RIMS) at Kyoto University, and the Tata Institute of Fundamental Research (TIFR) School of Mathematics in Mumbai.

== Research ==
=== Minimal surfaces ===
In 1970 Lawson constructed minimal embeddings of every compact surface into the Euclidean 3-sphere (with the exception of the real projective plane, which cannot be so embedded). This gave, for example, embedded 3-dimensional cones in Euclidean 4-space of every possible topological type. This also led to interesting periodic surfaces of constant mean curvature in Euclidean 3-space. His work in this area continued for years. One result with Jim Simons showed how to use minimal integral currents for basic riemannnian geometry, and they proved that a stable minimal current (one whose second variation of mass is ≥ 0) in complex projective space, is a positive algebraic cycle.

=== Foliations ===
Lawson found codimension-one foliations of higher dimensional spheres, which answered a long-term question and engendered much subsequent work.

=== Compact Manifolds of Negative Curvature ===
Together with S.-T. Yau Lawson found basic theorems about these manifolds, such as the Splitting Theorem which says that if the fundamental group splits as a product of groups, then the manifold essentially splits as a direct metric product of manifolds. These results were independently found by Detlef Gromoll and Joseph A. Wolf

=== Boundaries of Complex Analytic Varieties ===
Together with F. Reese Harvey Lawson characterized the compact oriented submanifolds of complex Euclidean space which bound complex analytic varieties. These submanifolds could have singularities, and the result has analogues in complex projective space minus a linear subspace of higher codimension. This was a vast geometric generalization of a classical result of S. Bochner.

=== Calibrated Geometries ===
In a 1982 Acta Mathematica paper of F. Reese Harvey and Blaine Lawson found large classes of submanifolds (even with singularities) that are always homologically volume minimizing. This means that if one takes a compact piece M with boundary, then M has volume less than or equal to the volume of any M' such that M - M' bounds something of higher dimension. This paper was engendered by work of Herbert Federer. It applied to submanifolds of certain Euclidean spaces, but also to more general manifolds with special geometries. It inspired Robert Bryant to discover G(2) and Spin(7) manifolds, answering a long-standing question. It turned out the calibrated geometries discovered by Harvey-Lawson play a role in M-theory in modern particle physics. As a result there has been an enormous amount of work in this area.

=== Manifolds of Positive Scalar Curvature ===
In a series of three papersMikhael Gromov and Lawson used the Dirac operator and other techniques to prove global results about manifolds with positive scalar curvature ? > 0. The first work in this area was done by Rick Schoen and S.-T. Yau in this area. Among many things Gromov and Lawson showed that for spin manifolds, the existence of a metric with ? > 0 depends only on the spin cobordism class of the manifold. They conjectured that a necessary and sufficient condition for ? > 0 was a KO-Theory analogue of the Aˆ-invariant. This conjecture was proved by Stephan Stoltz.

=== Algebraic Cycles ===
In his 1989 Annals of Mathematics paper "Algebraic Cycles and Homotopy Theory", Lawson proved a theorem which showed that the limit of codimension-q algebraic cycles in complex projective n-space Pn is a finite product of spaces which classify integer cohomology in degrees 2, 4, ..., 2q. This basic theorem has analogs on any projective variety, and the homotopy groups of the resulting space gives a new homology theory in algebraic geometry. With Marie-Louise Michelsohn they showed that the inclusion of the linear cycles in projective space leads to a map from K-theory to cohomology which is the total Chern class. Together with Eric Friedlander, a morphic cohomology was established for algebraic varieties, based on algebraic maps into cycles spaces on Pn, and this cohomology theory was shown to be dual the homology theory mentioned above.

Lawson and Friedlander also proved a Moving Lemma for families of algebraic cycles.

This cycle theory had many interesting applications in homotopy theory, which was worked out with Michelsohn, Paulo Lima-Filho, Charles Boyer, and Ben Mann.

=== Spin Geometry ===
Lawson and Michelsohn wrote a book, published by Princeton Press, which presented the deep index theorems proved by Atiyah and Singer. The book gave the fundamentals of Spin manifolds, K-theory and KO-theory, Clifford algebras and their relation to Bott Periodicity, the construction of Atiyah-Singer-Dirac operators, detailed proofs of various index theorems, and many applications were given. This text has been used worldwide for many years.

=== Singular Connections and Characteristic Currents ===
F. Reese Harvey and Lawson considered connections on vector bundles which were not smooth, and so the characteristic forms became singular currents. This led to a long sequence of interesting results.

=== Differential Characters ===
In Lawson, Harvey and Zweck established a Poincaré-Pontryagin Duality for the differential characters of Cheeger and Simons. They also gave a deRham-Federer theory of differential characters, that is, they gave various formulations of the theory using currents and forms. This was generalized to something called spark complexes which gives rise to differential characters. It gave a theory which established the equivalence of many, quite different spark complexes. This axiomatic approach did not look at a product structure, and so it allowed the deep product of Jeff Cheeger to be carried over to quite different contexts.

=== Projective Hulls and the Projective Gelfand Transformation ===
These results suggested a complex projective analogue of a theorem of John Wermer, which was proved in a number of cases.

=== Potential Theory on Calibrated Manifolds ===
Harvey and Lawson discovered that while calibrated manifolds do not have analogues of the holomorphic, or pluriharmonic, functions that exist in the Kaehler case, they always have plurisubharmonic functions and, in fact, each manifold has a potential theory (giving rise to these functions) which is, in a sense, dual to the calibrated structure. The plurisubharmonics can be maximized on a domain, subject to boundary constraints, to give solutions to analogues of the Monge-Ampère Equation.

=== The Dirichlet problem on Riemannian manifolds ===
Harvey and Lawson eventually realized that this situation on calibrated manifolds has a vast generalization leading to potential theories associated to quite general fully nonlinear differential equations. This led to the establishment of viscosity solutions to quite general differential equations on manifolds, and to the discovery of some new geometric differential equations. For example, this gave a new Lagrangian Monge-Ampère operator on Symplectic manifolds with a Gromov metric. The authors were able to solve the inhomogeneous Dirichlet Problem for inhomogeneous equations, they were able to solve the complex Monge-Ampère equation on almost complex manifolds, they developed a theory of tangents to subsolutions, and much more.

== Awards and honors ==
He was a 1975 recipient of the American Mathematical Society's Leroy P. Steele Prize for Exposition, and was elected to the National Academy of Sciences in 1995. He is a former recipient of both the Sloan Fellowship and the Guggenheim Fellowship, and has delivered two invited addresses at International Congresses of Mathematicians, one on geometry, and one on topology. He has served as Vice President of the American Mathematical Society, and is a foreign member of the Brazilian Academy of Sciences. For 2026 he was awarded the Leroy P. Steele Prize for Lifetime Achievement.

In 2012 he became a fellow of the American Mathematical Society. He was elected to the American Academy of Arts and Sciences in 2013.

== Major publications ==
- Lawson, H. Blaine Jr. (1969). "Local rigidity theorems for minimal hypersurfaces". Annals of Mathematics. Second Series. 89 (1): 187–197. doi:10.2307/1970816. JSTOR 1970816. MR 0238229. Zbl 0174.24901.
- Lawson, H. Blaine Jr. (1970). "Complete minimal surfaces in S^{3}". Annals of Mathematics. Second Series. 92 (3): 335–374. doi:10.2307/1970625. JSTOR 1970625. MR 0270280. Zbl 0205.52001.
- Lawson, H. Blaine (1970). "The unknottedness of minimal embeddings". Inventiones Mathematicae. 11: 183–187. MR 0287447.
- Lawson, H. Blaine Jr. (1971). "Codimension-one foliations of spheres". Annals of Mathematics. Second Series. 94 (3): 494–503. doi:10.2307/1970767. JSTOR 1970767. Zbl 0236.57014.
- Lawson, H. Blaine Jr.; Yau, Shing Tung (1972). "Compact manifolds of nonpositive curvature". Journal of Differential Geometry. 7 (1–2): 211–228. doi:10.4310/jdg/1214430828. MR 0334083. Zbl 0266.53035.
- Lawson, H. Blaine Jr.; Simons, James (1973). "On stable currents and their application to global problems in real and complex geometry". Annals of Mathematics. Second Series. 98 (3): 427–450. doi:10.2307/1970913. JSTOR 1970913. MR 0324529. Zbl 0283.53049.
- Lawson, H. Blaine Jr. (1974). "Foliations". Bulletin of the American Mathematical Society. 80 (3): 369–418. doi:10.1090/S0002-9904-1974-13432-4. MR 0343289. Zbl 0293.57014.
- Harvey, F. Reese; Lawson, H. Blaine Jr. (1975). "On boundaries of complex analytic varieties. I". Annals of Mathematics. Second Series. 102 (2): 223–290. doi:10.2307/1971032. JSTOR 1971032. MR 0425173. Zbl 0317.32017.
- Harvey, F. Reese; Lawson, H. Blaine Jr. (1977). "On boundaries of complex analytic varieties, II". Annals of Mathematics. Second Series. 106 (2): 213–238. doi:10.2307/1971093. JSTOR 1971093. Zbl 0361.32010.
- Lawson, H. Blaine Jr.; Osserman, Robert (1977). "Non-existence, non-uniqueness and irregularity of solutions to the minimal surface system". Acta Mathematica. 139: 1–17. Zbl 0376.49016.
- Gromov, Mikhael; Lawson, H. Blaine Jr. (1980). "Spin and scalar curvature in the presence of a fundamental group. I". Annals of Mathematics. Second Series. 111 (2): 209–230. doi:10.2307/1971198. JSTOR 1971198. MR 0569070. Zbl 0445.53025.
- Gromov, Mikhael; Lawson, H. Blaine Jr. (1980). "The classification of simply connected manifolds of positive scalar curvature". Annals of Mathematics. Second Series. 111 (3): 423–434. doi:10.2307/1971103. JSTOR 1971103. MR 0577131. Zbl 0463.53025.
- Gromov, Mikhael; Lawson, H. Blaine Jr. (1983). "Positive scalar curvature and the Dirac operator on complete Riemannian manifolds". Publications Mathématiques de l'IHÉS. 58: 83–196. doi:10.1007/BF02953774. MR 0720933. S2CID 123212001. Zbl 0538.53047.
- Bourguignon, Jean-Pierre; Lawson, H. Blaine Jr.; Simons, James (1979). "Stability and gap phenomena for Yang-Mills fields". Proceedings of the National Academy of Sciences of the United States of America. 76 (4): 1550–1553. doi:10.1073/pnas.76.4.1550. MR 0526178. PMC 383330. PMID 16592658. Zbl 0408.53023.
- Bourguignon, Jean-Pierre; Lawson, H. Blaine Jr. (1981). "Stability and isolation phenomena for Yang–Mills fields". Communications in Mathematical Physics. 79 (2): 189–230. Bibcode:1981CMaPh..79..189B. doi:10.1007/BF01942061. MR 0612248. S2CID 121935427. Zbl 0475.53060.
- Harvey, Reese; Lawson, H. Blaine Jr. (1982). "Calibrated geometries". Acta Mathematica. 148: 47–157. doi:10.1007/BF02392726. MR 0666108. Zbl 0584.53021.
- Harvey, F. Reese; Lawson, H. Blaine Jr. (1983). "An intrinsic characterization of Kähler manifolds". Inventiones Mathematicae. 74 (2): 169–198. doi:10.1007/BF01394312. Zbl 0553.32008.
- Galicki, K.; Lawson, H. Blaine Jr. (1988). "Quaternionic reduction and quaternionic orbifolds". Mathematische Annalen. 282 (1): 1–21. doi:10.1007/BF01457009. Zbl 0628.53060.
- Lawson, H. Blaine Jr. (1989). "Algebraic cycles and homotopy theory". Annals of Mathematics. Second Series. 129 (2): 253–291. doi:10.2307/1971448. JSTOR 1971448. MR 0986794. Zbl 0688.14006.
- Lawson, H. Blaine Jr.; Michelsohn, Marie-Louise (1988). "Algebraic cycles, Bott periodicity and the Chern characteristic map". In Wells, R. O. Jr. (ed.). The Mathematical Heritage of Hermann Weyl. Proceedings of Symposia in Pure Mathematics. Vol. 48. Providence, RI: American Mathematical Society. pp. 241–263. ISBN 978-0-8218-1482-6. Zbl 0665.14001.
- Friedlander, Eric M.; Lawson, H. Blaine Jr. (1992). "A theory of algebraic cocycles". Annals of Mathematics. Second Series. 136 (2): 361–428. arXiv:math/9204230. doi:10.2307/2946609. JSTOR 2946609. Zbl 0788.14014.
- Friedlander, Eric M.; Lawson, H. Blaine Jr.; Lima-Filho, Paulo; Michelsohn, Marie-Louise (1996). "Algebraic cycles and equivariant cohomology theories". Proceedings of the London Mathematical Society. 73 (3): 679–720. doi:10.1112/plms/s3-73.3.679. Zbl 0864.55008.
- Friedlander, Eric M.; Lawson, H. Blaine Jr. (1997). "Duality relating spaces of algebraic cocycles and cycles". Topology. 36 (3): 533–565. doi:10.1016/0040-9383(96)00011-0.
- Friedlander, Eric M.; Lawson, H. Blaine Jr. (1998). "Moving algebraic cycles of bounded degree". Inventiones Mathematicae. 132 (1): 91–119. doi:10.1007/s002220050219. Zbl 0936.14005.
- Boyer, Charles P.; Lawson, H. Blaine Jr.; Lima-Filho, Paulo; Mann, Benjamin M.; Michelsohn, Marie-Louise (1993). "Algebraic cycles and infinite loop spaces". Inventiones Mathematicae. 113 (2): 373–388. doi:10.1007/BF01244311. Zbl 0797.55006.
- Lawson, H. Blaine Jr.; Lima-Filho, Paulo; Michelsohn, Marie-Louise (1998). "On equivariant algebraic suspension". Journal of Algebraic Geometry. 7 (4): 627–650. MR 1642736. Zbl 0940.14014.
- Harvey, F. Reese; Lawson, H. Blaine Jr. (2000). "Singularities and Chern-Weil Theory I: The local MacPherson formula". Asian Journal of Mathematics. 4 (1): 71–95. doi:10.4310/AJM.2000.v4.n1.a6. Zbl 0981.58003.
- Harvey, F. Reese; Lawson, H. Blaine Jr. (2001). "Finite volume flows and Morse theory". Annals of Mathematics. Second Series. 153 (1): 1–25. doi:10.2307/2661371. JSTOR 2661371. MR 1826410.
- Harvey, F. Reese; Lawson, H. Blaine Jr. (2001). "Lefschetz-Pontrjagin duality for differential characters". Anais da Academia Brasileira de Ciências. 73 (2): 145–159. arXiv:math/0512528. doi:10.1590/S0001-37652001000200001. Zbl 0992.32003.
- Lawson, H. Blaine Jr.; Lima-Filho, Paulo; Michelsohn, Marie-Louise (2003). "Algebraic cycles and the classical groups. I: Real cycles". Topology. 42 (2): 467–506. arXiv:math/9912154. doi:10.1016/S0040-9383(02)00018-6. Zbl 1043.14002.
- Harvey, F. Reese; Lawson, H. Blaine Jr.; Zweck, John (2003). "The de Rham-Federer theory of differential characters and character duality". American Journal of Mathematics. 125 (4): 791–847. arXiv:math/0512251. Zbl 1060.58004.
- Lawson, H. Blaine Jr.; Lima-Filho, Paulo; Michelsohn, Marie-Louise (2005). "Algebraic cycles and the classical groups II: Quaternionic cycles". Geometry & Topology. 9 (3): 1187–1220. arXiv:math/0507451. doi:10.2140/gt.2005.9.1187. Zbl 1081.14013.
- Harvey, Reese; Lawson, H. Blaine Jr. (2006). "From sparks to grundles — differential characters". Communications in Analysis and Geometry. 14 (1): 25–58. arXiv:math/0306193. doi:10.4310/CAG.2006.v14.n1.a2. Zbl 1116.53048.
- Harvey, F. Reese; Lawson, H. Blaine Jr. (2006). "Projective hulls and the projective Gelfand transformation". Asian Journal of Mathematics. 10 (3): 607–646. arXiv:math/0510286. doi:10.4310/AJM.2006.v10.n3.a5. Zbl 1178.32008.
- Harvey, F. Reese; Lawson, H. Blaine Jr. (2009). "An introduction to potential theory in calibrated geometry". American Journal of Mathematics. 131 (4): 893–944. arXiv:0710.3920. doi:10.1353/ajm.0.0067. Zbl 1170.53031.
- Harvey, F. Reese; Lawson, H. Blaine Jr. (2009). "Duality of positive currents and plurisubharmonic functions in calibrated geometry". American Journal of Mathematics. 131 (5): 1211–1240. arXiv:0710.3921. doi:10.1353/ajm.0.0072. MR 2552483. Zbl 1186.53063.
- Harvey, F. Reese; Lawson, H. Blaine Jr. (2009). "Dirichlet duality and the nonlinear Dirichlet problem". Communications on Pure and Applied Mathematics. 62 (3): 396–443. arXiv:0710.3991. doi:10.1002/cpa.20265. Zbl 1173.35062.
- Harvey, F. Reese; Lawson, H. Blaine Jr. (2011). "Dirichlet duality and the nonlinear Dirichlet problem on Riemannian manifolds". Journal of Differential Geometry. 88 (3): 395–482. arXiv:0907.1981. Zbl 1235.53042.
- Harvey, F. Reese; Lawson, H. Blaine Jr. (2013). "p-convexity, p-plurisubharmonicity and the Levi problem". Indiana University Mathematics Journal. 62 (1): 149–169. arXiv:1111.3895. Zbl 1288.32046.
- Harvey, F. Reese; Lawson, H. Blaine Jr. (2013). "The equivalence of viscosity and distributional subsolutions for convex subequations: the strong Bellman principle". Bulletin of the Brazilian Mathematical Society. New Series. 44 (4): 621–652. arXiv:1301.4914.
- Harvey, F. Reese; Lawson, H. Blaine Jr. (2014). "The restriction theorem for fully nonlinear subequations". Annales de l'Institut Fourier. 64 (1): 217–265. arXiv:1101.4850. doi:10.5802/aif.2846. MR 3330548. Zbl 1320.32037.
- Harvey, F. Reese; Lawson, H. Blaine Jr. (2015). "Potential theory on almost complex manifolds". Annales de l'Institut Fourier. 65 (1): 171–210. arXiv:1107.2584.
- Harvey, F. Reese; Lawson, H. Blaine Jr.; Plis, S. (2016). "Smooth approximation of plurisubharmonic functions on almost complex manifolds". Mathematische Annalen. 366 (3): 929–940. arXiv:1411.7137.
- Harvey, F. Reese; Lawson, H. Blaine Jr. (2017). "Tangents to subsolutions – existence and uniqueness, Part II". Journal of Geometric Analysis. 27 (4): 2960–2996. arXiv:1408.5851.
- Harvey, F. Reese; Lawson, H. Blaine Jr. (2018). "Tangents to subsolutions – existence and uniqueness, Part I". Annales de la Faculté des Sciences de Toulouse. Mathématiques (6e série). 27 (4): 777–848. arXiv:1408.5797. doi:10.5802/afst.1583. MR 3884610. Zbl 1412.35140.
- Harvey, R.; Lawson, H. Blaine (2018). "Lagrangian potential theory and a Lagrangian equation of Monge-Ampère type". In Cao, H.-D.; Li, J.; Schoen, R.; Yau, S.-T. (eds.). Surveys in Differential Geometry. Vol. 22. Somerville, MA: International Press. pp. 217–258. arXiv:1712.03525.
- Harvey, F. Reese; Lawson, H. Blaine Jr.; Pliś, Szymon (2020). "The Richberg technique for subsolutions". Communications in Analysis and Geometry. 28 (8): 1787–1806. arXiv:2005.04033. doi:10.4310/cag.2020.v28.n8.a2. Zbl 1475.31005.
- Harvey, F. Reese; Lawson, H. Blaine Jr. (2021). "Pseudoconvexity for the special Lagrangian potential equation". Calculus of Variations and Partial Differential Equations. 60 (1): 6. arXiv:2001.09818. doi:10.1007/s00526-020-01850-1. Zbl 1456.35089.
- Harvey, F. Reese; Lawson, H. Blaine Jr. (2023). "Determinant majorization and the work of Guo-Phong-Tong and Abja-Olive". Calculus of Variations and Partial Differential Equations. 62 (11): 153. arXiv:2207.01729. Zbl 1520.15005.
- Harvey, R.; Lawson, H. Blaine Jr. (2024). "A definitive determinant majorization result for nonlinear operators". arXiv:2407.05408 [math.AP].

Books

- Lawson, H. Blaine Jr. (1980). Lectures on minimal submanifolds. Vol. I. Mathematics Lecture Series. Vol. 9 (Second edition of 1977 original ed.). Wilmington, DE: Publish or Perish, Inc. ISBN 0-914098-18-7. MR 0576752. Zbl 0434.53006.
- Lawson, H. Blaine Jr. (1977). The quantitative theory of foliations. CBMS Regional Conference Series in Mathematics. Vol. 27. Providence, RI: American Mathematical Society. doi:10.1090/cbms/027. ISBN 0-8218-1677-2. Zbl 0343.57014.
- Lawson, H. Blaine Jr. (1974). Minimal varieties in real and complex geometry. Séminaire de mathématiques supérieures. Vol. 57. Montréal: Les Presses de l'Université de Montréal. ISBN 0840502486. Zbl 0328.53001.
- Lawson, H. Blaine Jr. (1985). The theory of gauge fields in four dimensions. CBMS Regional Conference Series in Mathematics. Vol. 58. Providence, RI: American Mathematical Society. doi:10.1090/cbms/058. ISBN 0-8218-0708-0. MR 0799712. Zbl 0597.53001.
- Lawson, H. Blaine Jr.; Michelsohn, Marie-Louise (1989). Spin geometry. Princeton Mathematical Series. Vol. 38. Princeton, NJ: Princeton University Press. ISBN 0-691-08542-0. MR 1031992. Zbl 0688.57001.
- Harvey, F. Reese; Lawson, H. Blaine Jr. (1993). A theory of characteristic currents associated with a singular connection. Astérisque. Vol. 213. Montrouge: Société Mathématique de France. ISBN 978-2-85629-202-0. Zbl 0804.53037.
- Cirant, Marco; Harvey, F. Reese; Lawson, H. Blaine Jr.; Payne, Kevin R. (2023). Comparison principles for general potential theories and PDEs. Annals of Mathematics Studies. Vol. 218. Princeton, NJ: Princeton University Press. doi:10.1515/9780691243641. ISBN 978-0-691-24361-0.

== See also ==
- Spin geometry
