= Marie-Louise Michelsohn =

American mathematician

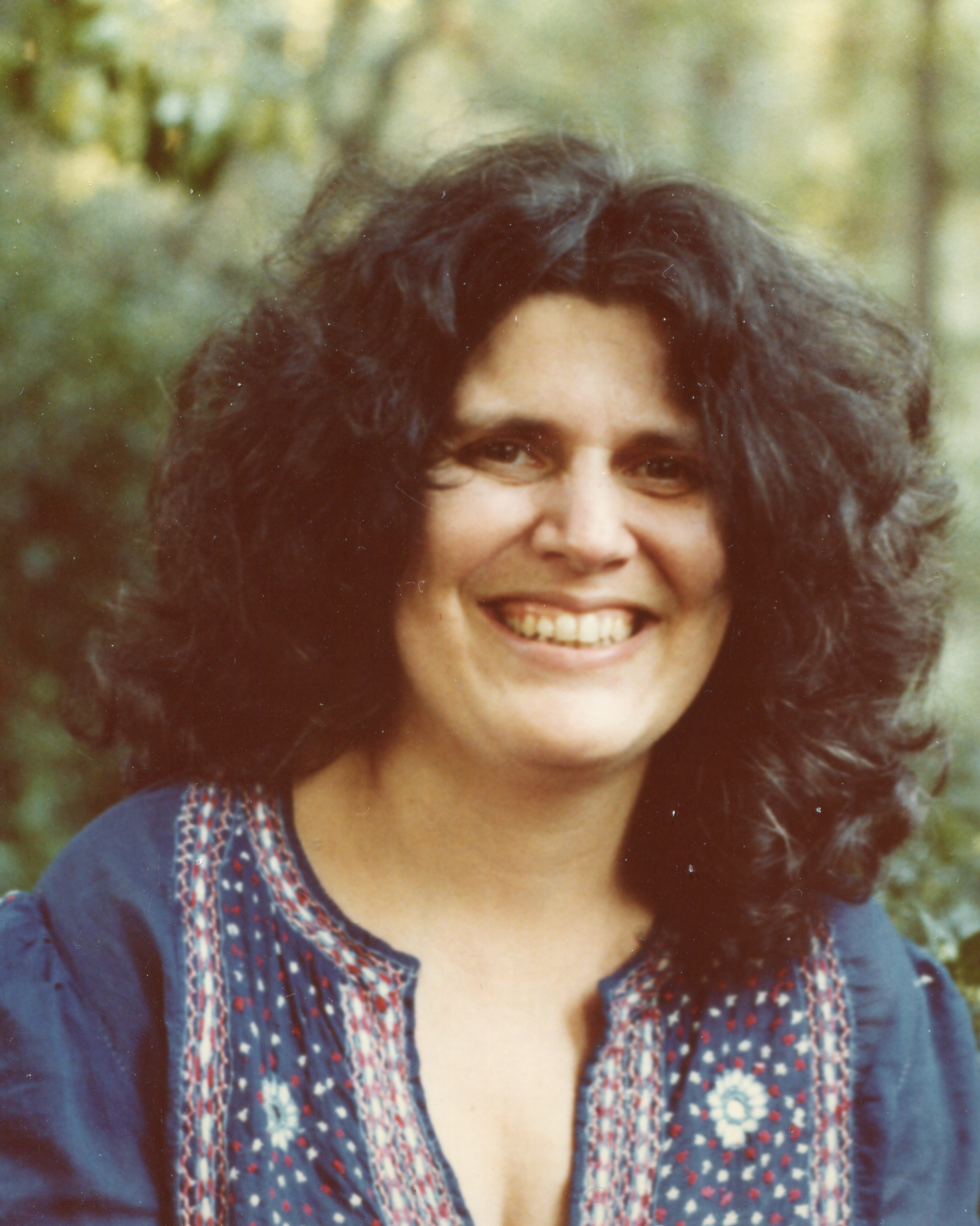
Michelsohn in 1982

Marie-Louise Michelsohn (born October 8, 1941) is a professor of mathematics at State University of New York at Stony Brook.

== Education ==
Michelsohn attended the Bronx High School of Science. She attended the University of Chicago for her undergraduate and graduate studies, including her PhD.

She spent a year as a visiting professor at University of California at San Diego. She spent a year l'Institut des Hautes Études Scientifiques outside of Paris, France. She then joined the faculty of State University of New York at Stony Brook.

== Mathematical work ==
Michelsohn's PhD was in the field of topology. As of 2020, she has published twenty articles, on topics including complex geometry, spin manifolds and the Dirac operator, and the theory of algebraic cycles. Half of her work has been in collaboration with Blaine Lawson. With Lawson, she wrote a textbook on spin geometry which has become the standard reference for the field.

In her most widely-known work, published in 1982, Michelsohn investigated the notion of a balanced metric on a complex manifold. These are hermitian metrics for which the penultimate power of the associated Kähler form is closed, i.e.

$$d(\underbrace{\omega\wedge\cdots\wedge\omega}_{n-1\text{ times}})=0,$$

in which ω is the Kähler form and n is the complex dimension. Note that, even though it is reported in multiple sources that Michelsohn introduced balanced metrics, this is not true as these metrics had already been studied before under the name semi-Kähler, she introduced the alternative terminology, which has now become standard as her paper is the first comprehensive investigation of such property. It is trivial to see that every Kähler metric is a balanced metric. As for Kähler metrics, the above definition of a balanced metric automatically places cohomological restrictions on the underlying manifold; by Stokes' theorem, every codimension-one complex subvariety is homologically nontrivial. For instance, the Calabi-Eckmann complex manifolds do not support any balanced metrics. Michelsohn also recast the definition of a balanced metric in terms of the torsion tensor and in terms of the Dirac operator. In parallel to a work of Reese Harvey and Blaine Lawson's on Kähler metrics, Michelsohn obtained a full characterization, in terms of the cohomological theory of currents, of which complex manifolds admit balanced metrics.

Balanced metrics are, in part, of interest due to their role in the Strominger system arising from string theory.

== Masters athletics ==
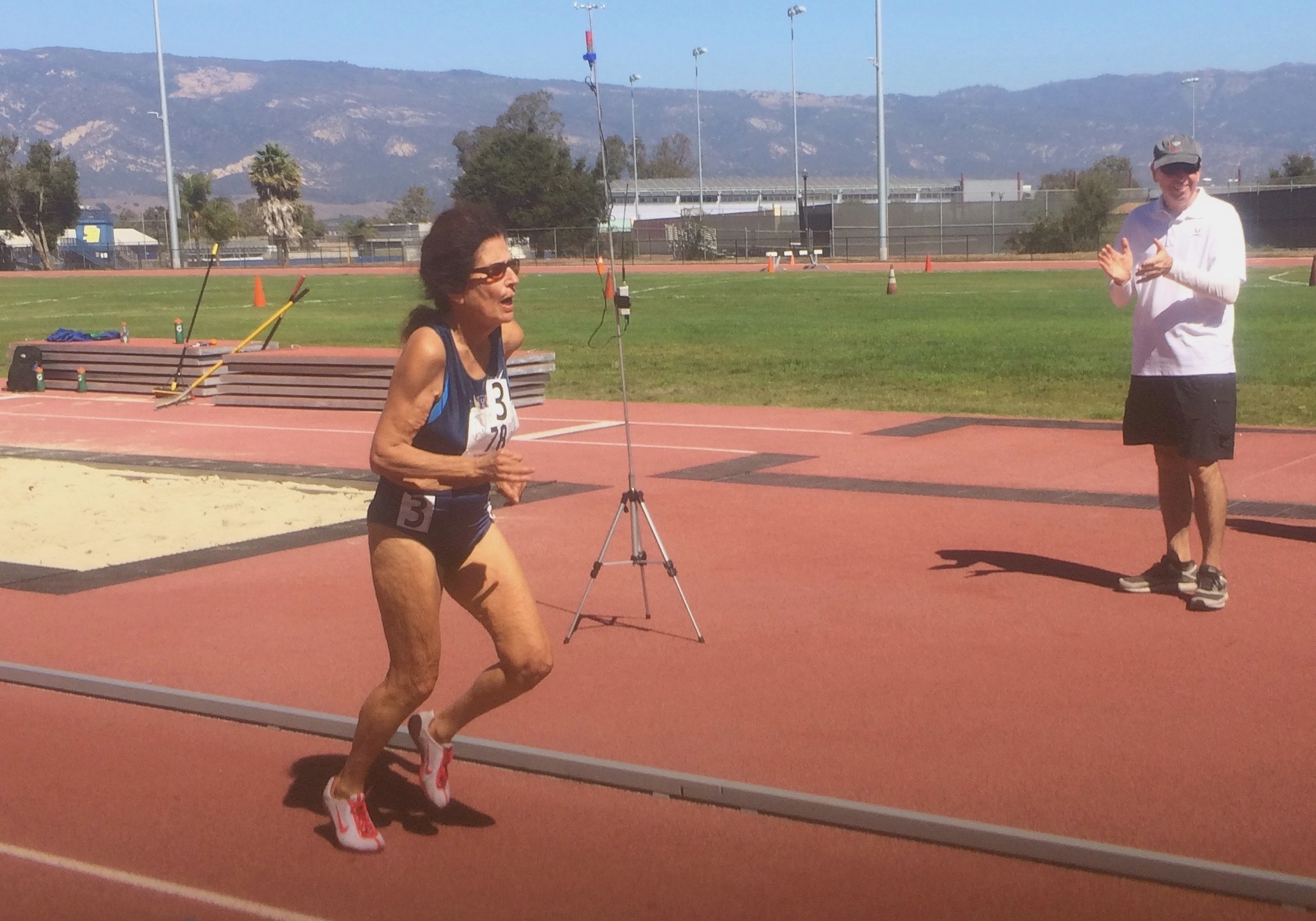
Marie-Louise Michelsohn setting the W75 world record in the steeplechase

Michelsohn is also an accomplished middle and long-distance runner. She holds five masters athletics world records including through three age divisions of the 2000 metres steeplechase which she has held since 2002. In addition to the world records, she holds 6 more outdoor American records and 10 indoor American records, running the table of all official indoor distances 800 metres and above in both the W65 and W70 divisions.

== Notable publications ==
- Michelsohn, M. L. (1982). "On the existence of special metrics in complex geometry". Acta Mathematica. 149: 261–295. doi:10.1007/BF02392356. MR 0688351. Zbl 0531.53053.
- Lawson, H. Blaine Jr.; Michelsohn, Marie-Louise (1989). Spin geometry. Princeton Mathematical Series. Vol. 38. Princeton, NJ: Princeton University Press. ISBN 0-691-08542-0. MR 1031992. Zbl 0688.57001.
