= Spinor bundle =

Geometric structure

In differential geometry, given a spin structure on an $n$-dimensional orientable Riemannian manifold $(M, g),\,$ one defines the spinor bundle to be the complex vector bundle $\pi_{\mathbf S}\colon{\mathbf S}\to M\,$ associated to the corresponding principal bundle $\pi_{\mathbf P}\colon{\mathbf P}\to M\,$ of spin frames over $M$ and the spin representation of its structure group ${\mathrm {Spin}}(n)\,$ on the space of spinors $\Delta_n$.

A section of the spinor bundle ${\mathbf S}\,$ is called a spinor field.

== Formal definition ==
Let $({\mathbf P},F_{\mathbf P})$ be a spin structure on a Riemannian manifold $(M, g),\,$that is, an equivariant lift of the oriented orthonormal frame bundle $\mathrm F_{SO}(M)\to M$ with respect to the double covering $\rho\colon {\mathrm {Spin}}(n)\to {\mathrm {SO}}(n)$ of the special orthogonal group by the spin group.

The spinor bundle ${\mathbf S}\,$ is defined to be the complex vector bundle ${\mathbf S}={\mathbf P}\times_{\kappa}\Delta_n\,$ associated to the spin structure ${\mathbf P}$ via the spin representation $\kappa\colon {\mathrm {Spin}}(n)\to {\mathrm U}(\Delta_n),\,$ where ${\mathrm U}({\mathbf W})\,$ denotes the group of unitary operators acting on a Hilbert space ${\mathbf W}.\,$ The spin representation $\kappa$ is a faithful and unitary representation of the group ${\mathrm {Spin}}(n).$

== See also ==
- Clifford bundle
- Clifford module bundle
- Orthonormal frame bundle
- Spin geometry
- Spinor
- Spinor representation
