= Christian Bär =

German mathematician

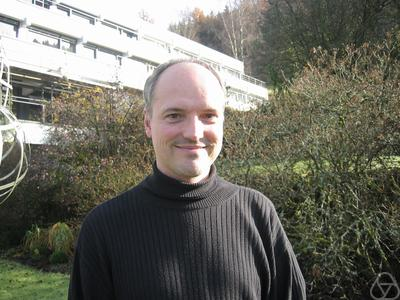
- Christian Bär
- Born: 17 September 1962 (age 62); Kaiserslautern, Germany
- Occupation: German mathematician

Christian Bär (born 17 September 1962 in Kaiserslautern) is a German mathematician, whose research concerns differential geometry and mathematical physics.

Bär enrolled on Ph.D. studies at the University of Bonn as a student of Hans Werner Ballmann, and obtained his Ph.D. in 1990.

He was elected president of the German Mathematical Society, having assumed the post in 2011.

== Selected papers ==
- Bär, Christian (1993). "Real Killing spinors and holonomy". Communications in Mathematical Physics. 154 (3). Springer Science and Business Media LLC: 509–521. Bibcode:1993CMaPh.154..509B. doi:10.1007/bf02102106. ISSN 0010-3616. S2CID 121417796.
- Bär, Christian (1998). "Extrinsic Bounds for Eigenvalues of the Dirac Operator". Annals of Global Analysis and Geometry. 16 (6). Springer Science and Business Media LLC: 573–596. arXiv:math/9805064. Bibcode:1998math......5064B. doi:10.1023/a:1006550532236. ISSN 0232-704X. S2CID 14458332.
