= Spin structure =

Concept in differential geometry

In differential geometry, a spin structure on an orientable Riemannian manifold (M, g) allows one to define associated spinor bundles, giving rise to the notion of a spinor in differential geometry.

Spin structures have wide applications to mathematical physics, in particular to quantum field theory where they are an essential ingredient in the definition of any theory with uncharged fermions. They are also of purely mathematical interest in differential geometry, algebraic topology, and K theory. They form the foundation for spin geometry.

== Overview ==
In geometry and in field theory, mathematicians ask whether or not a given oriented Riemannian manifold (M,g) admits spinors. One method for dealing with this problem is to require that M have a spin structure. This is not always possible since there is potentially a topological obstruction to the existence of spin structures. Spin structures will exist if and only if the second Stiefel–Whitney class w_{2}(M) ∈ H^{2}(M, Z_{2}) of M vanishes. Furthermore, if w_{2}(M) = 0, then the set of the isomorphism classes of spin structures on M is acted upon freely and transitively by H^{1}(M, Z_{2}) . As the manifold M is assumed to be oriented, the first Stiefel–Whitney class w_{1}(M) ∈ H^{1}(M, Z_{2}) of M vanishes too. (The Stiefel–Whitney classes w_{i}(M) ∈ H^{i}(M, Z_{2}) of a manifold M are defined to be the Stiefel–Whitney classes of its tangent bundle TM.)

The bundle of spinors π_{S}: S → M over M is then the complex vector bundle associated with the corresponding principal bundle π_{P}: P → M of spin frames over M and the spin representation of its structure group Spin(n) on the space of spinors Δ_{n}. The bundle S is called the spinor bundle for a given spin structure on M.

A precise definition of spin structure on manifold was possible only after the notion of fiber bundle had been introduced; André Haefliger (1956) found the topological obstruction to the existence of a spin structure on an orientable Riemannian manifold and Max Karoubi (1968) extended this result to the non-orientable pseudo-Riemannian case.

== Spin structures on Riemannian manifolds ==
=== Definition ===
A spin structure on an orientable Riemannian manifold $(M,g)$ with an oriented vector bundle $E$ is an equivariant lift of the orthonormal frame bundle $P_{\operatorname{SO}}(E) \rightarrow M$ with respect to the double covering $\rho : \operatorname{Spin}(n) \rightarrow \operatorname{SO}(n)$. In other words, a pair $(P_{\operatorname{Spin}}, \phi)$ is a spin structure on the SO(n)-principal bundle $\pi: P_{\operatorname{SO}}(E) \rightarrow M$ when

1. $\pi_{P} : P_{\operatorname{Spin}} \rightarrow M$ is a principal Spin(n)-bundle over $M$, and
2. $\phi: P_{\operatorname{Spin}} \rightarrow P_{\operatorname{SO}}(E)$ is an equivariant 2-fold covering map such that
  $\pi\circ \phi=\pi_P \quad$and$\quad \phi(pq) = \phi(p)\rho(q) \quad$for all $p \in P_{\operatorname{Spin}}$ and $q \in \operatorname{Spin}(n)$.

Two spin structures $(P_1, \phi_1)$ and $(P_2, \phi_2)$ on the same oriented Riemannian manifold are called "equivalent" if there exists a Spin(n)-equivariant map $f: P_1 \rightarrow P_2$ such that

$\phi_2\circ f=\phi_1 \quad$ and $\quad f(p q) = f(p)q \quad$ for all $p\in P_1$ and $q \in \operatorname{Spin}(n)$.

In this case $\phi_1$ and $\phi_2$ are two equivalent double coverings.

The definition of spin structure on $(M,g)$ as a spin structure on the principal bundle $P_{\operatorname{SO}}(E) \rightarrow M$ is due to André Haefliger (1956).

=== Obstruction ===
Haefliger found necessary and sufficient conditions for the existence of a spin structure on an oriented Riemannian manifold (M,g). The obstruction to having a spin structure is a certain element [k] of H^{2}(M, Z_{2}) . For a spin structure the class [k] is the second Stiefel–Whitney class w_{2}(M) ∈ H^{2}(M, Z_{2}) of M. Hence, a spin structure exists if and only if the second Stiefel–Whitney class w_{2}(M) ∈ H^{2}(M, Z_{2}) of M vanishes.

== Spin structures on vector bundles ==
Let M be a paracompact topological manifold and E an oriented vector bundle on M of dimension n equipped with a fibre metric. This means that at each point of M, the fibre of E is an inner product space. A spinor bundle of E is a prescription for consistently associating a spin representation to every point of M. There are topological obstructions to being able to do it, and consequently, a given bundle E may not admit any spinor bundle. In case it does, one says that the bundle E is spin.

This may be made rigorous through the language of principal bundles. The collection of oriented orthonormal frames of a vector bundle form a frame bundle P_{SO}(E), which is a principal bundle under the action of the special orthogonal group SO(n). A spin structure for P_{SO}(E) is a lift of P_{SO}(E) to a principal bundle P_{Spin}(E) under the action of the spin group Spin(n), by which we mean that there exists a bundle map $\phi$ : P_{Spin}(E) → P_{SO}(E) such that

$\phi(pg) = \phi(p)\rho(g)$, for all p ∈ P_{Spin}(E) and g ∈ Spin(n),

where ρ : Spin(n) → SO(n) is the mapping of groups presenting the spin group as a double-cover of SO(n).

In the special case in which E is the tangent bundle TM over the base manifold M, if a spin structure exists then one says that M is a spin manifold. Equivalently M is spin if the SO(n) principal bundle of orthonormal bases of the tangent fibers of M is a Z_{2} quotient of a principal spin bundle.

If the manifold has a cell decomposition or a triangulation, a spin structure can equivalently be thought of as a homotopy class of a trivialization of the tangent bundle over the 1-skeleton that extends over the 2-skeleton. If the dimension is lower than 3, one first takes a Whitney sum with a trivial line bundle.

=== Obstruction and classification ===
For an orientable vector bundle $\pi_E:E \to M$ a spin structure exists on $E$ if and only if the second Stiefel–Whitney class $w_2(E)$ vanishes. This is a result of Armand Borel and Friedrich Hirzebruch. Furthermore, in the case $E \to M$ is spin, the number of spin structures are in bijection with $H^1(M,\mathbf{Z}/2)$. These results can be easily proven^{pg 110-111} using a spectral sequence argument for the associated principal $\operatorname{SO}(n)$-bundle $P_E \to M$. Notice this gives a fibration
$$\operatorname{SO}(n) \to P_E \to M,$$
hence the Serre spectral sequence can be applied. From general theory of spectral sequences, there is an exact sequence
$$0 \to E_3^{0,1} \to E_2^{0,1} \overset{w_2}{\rightarrow} E_2^{2,0} \to E_3^{2,0} \to 0$$
where
$$\begin{align}
E_2^{0,1} &= H^0(M, H^1(\operatorname{SO}(n),\mathbf{Z}/2)) = H^1(\operatorname{SO}(n),\mathbf{Z}/2) = \mathbf{Z}/2 \\
E_2^{2,0} &= H^2(M, H^0(\operatorname{SO}(n),\mathbf{Z}/2)) = H^2(M,\mathbf{Z}/2).
\end{align}$$
In addition, $E_\infty^{0,1} = E_3^{0,1}$ and $E_\infty^{0,1} = H^1(P_E,\mathbf{Z}/2)/F^1(H^1(P_E,\mathbf{Z}/2))$ for some filtration $F$ on $H^1(P_E,\mathbf{Z}/2)$, hence we get a map
$$H^1(P_E,\mathbf{Z}/2) \to E_3^{0,1}$$
giving an exact sequence
$$H^1(P_E,\mathbf{Z}/2) \to H^1(\operatorname{SO}(n),\mathbf{Z}/2) \overset{w_2}{\rightarrow}  H^2(M,\mathbf{Z}/2).$$
Now, a spin structure is exactly a double covering of $P_E$ fitting into a commutative diagram
$$\begin{matrix}
\operatorname{Spin}(n) & \to & \tilde{P}_E & \to & M \\
\downarrow & & \downarrow & & \downarrow \\
\operatorname{SO}(n) & \to & P_E & \to & M
\end{matrix}$$
where the two left vertical maps are the double covering maps. Note double coverings of $P_E$ are in bijection with index $2$ subgroups of $\pi_1(P_E)$, equivalently, are in bijection with the set of group morphisms $\text{Hom}(\pi_1(P_E), \mathbf{Z}/2)$. But, from Hurewicz theorem and change of coefficients, this is exactly the cohomology group $H^1(P_E,\mathbf{Z}/2)$. Applying the same argument to $\operatorname{SO}(n)$, the non-trivial covering $\operatorname{Spin}(n) \to \operatorname{SO}(n)$ corresponds to $1 \in H^1(\operatorname{SO}(n),\mathbf{Z}/2) = \mathbf{Z}/2$, and the map to $H^2(M,\mathbf{Z}/2)$ is precisely the $w_2$ of the second Stiefel–Whitney class, hence $w_2(1) = w_2(E)$. If it vanishes, then the inverse image of $1$ under the map
$$H^1(P_E,\mathbf{Z}/2) \to H^1(\operatorname{SO}(n),\mathbf{Z}/2)$$
is the set of double coverings giving spin structures. Now, this subset of $H^1(P_E,\mathbf{Z}/2)$ can be identified with $H^1(M,\mathbf{Z}/2)$, showing this latter cohomology group classifies the various spin structures on the vector bundle $E \to M$. This can be done by looking at the long exact sequence of homotopy groups of the fibration
$$\pi_1(\operatorname{SO}(n)) \to \pi_1(P_E) \to \pi_1(M) \to 1$$
and applying $\text{Hom}(-,\mathbf{Z}/2)$, giving the sequence of cohomology groups
$$0 \to H^1(M,\mathbf{Z}/2) \to H^1(P_E,\mathbf{Z}/2) \to H^1(\operatorname{SO}(n),\mathbf{Z}/2).$$
Because $H^1(M,\mathbf{Z}/2)$ is the kernel, and the inverse image of $1 \in H^1(\operatorname{SO}(n),\mathbf{Z}/2)$ is in bijection with the kernel, we have the desired result.

==== Remarks on classification ====
When spin structures exist, the inequivalent spin structures on a manifold have a one-to-one correspondence (not canonical) with the elements of H^{1}(M,Z_{2}), which by the universal coefficient theorem is isomorphic to H_{1}(M,Z_{2}). More precisely, the space of the isomorphism classes of spin structures is an affine space over H^{1}(M,Z_{2}).

Intuitively, for each nontrivial cycle on M a spin structure corresponds to a binary choice of whether a section of the SO(N) bundle switches sheets when one encircles the loop. If w_{2} vanishes then these choices may be extended over the two-skeleton, then (by obstruction theory) they may automatically be extended over all of M. In particle physics this corresponds to a choice of periodic or antiperiodic boundary conditions for fermions going around each loop. Note that on a complex manifold $X$ the second Stiefel-Whitney class can be computed as the first Chern class $\text{mod } 2$.

=== Examples ===
1. A genus g Riemann surface admits 2^{2g} inequivalent spin structures; see theta characteristic.
2. If H^{2}(M,Z_{2}) vanishes, M is spin. For example, S^{n} is spin for all $n\neq 2$. (Note that S^{2} is also spin, but for different reasons; see below.)
3. The complex projective plane CP^{2} is not spin.
4. More generally, all even-dimensional complex projective spaces CP^{2n} are not spin.
5. All odd-dimensional complex projective spaces CP^{2n+1} are spin.
6. All compact, orientable manifolds of dimension 3 or less are spin.
7. All Calabi–Yau manifolds are spin.

=== Properties ===
- The Â genus of a spin manifold is an integer, and is an even integer if in addition the dimension is 4 mod 8.
  In general the Â genus is a rational invariant, defined for any manifold, but it is not in general an integer.
  This was originally proven by Hirzebruch and Borel, and can be proven by the Atiyah–Singer index theorem, by realizing the Â genus as the index of a Dirac operator – a Dirac operator is a square root of a second order operator, and exists due to the spin structure being a "square root". This was a motivating example for the index theorem.

== Spin^{C} structures ==
A spin^{C} structure is analogous to a spin structure on an oriented Riemannian manifold, but uses the Spin^{C} group, which is defined instead by the exact sequence

$$1 \to\mathbf Z_2\to \operatorname{Spin}^{\mathbf{C}}(n) \to \operatorname{SO}(n)\times\operatorname{U}(1) \to 1.$$

To motivate this, suppose that κ : Spin(n) → U(N) is a complex spinor representation. The center of U(N) consists of the diagonal elements coming from the inclusion i : U(1) → U(N), i.e., the scalar multiples of the identity. Thus there is a homomorphism

$$\kappa\times i\colon {\mathrm {Spin}}(n)\times {\mathrm U}(1)\to {\mathrm U}(N).$$

This will always have the element (−1,−1) in the kernel. Taking the quotient modulo this element gives the group Spin^{C}(n). This is the twisted product

$${\mathrm {Spin}}^{\mathbf C}(n) = {\mathrm {Spin}}(n)\times_{\mathbf Z_2} {\mathrm U}(1)\, ,$$

where U(1) = SO(2) = S^{1}. In other words, the group Spin^{C}(n) is a central extension of SO(n) by S^{1}.

Viewed another way, Spin^{C}(n) is the quotient group obtained from Spin(n) × Spin(2) with respect to the normal Z_{2} which is generated by the pair of covering transformations for the bundles Spin(n) → SO(n) and Spin(2) → SO(2) respectively. This makes the Spin^{C} group both a bundle over the circle with fibre Spin(n), and a bundle over SO(n) with fibre a circle.

The fundamental group π_{1}(Spin^{C}(n)) is isomorphic to Z if n ≠ 2, and to Z ⊕ Z if n = 2.

If the manifold has a cell decomposition or a triangulation, a spin^{C} structure can be equivalently thought of as a homotopy class of complex structure over the 2-skeleton that extends over the 3-skeleton. Similarly to the case of spin structures, one takes a Whitney sum with a trivial line bundle if the manifold is odd-dimensional.

Yet another definition is that a spin^{C} structure on a manifold N is a complex line bundle L over N together with a spin structure on TN ⊕ L.

=== Obstruction ===
A spin^{C} structure exists when the bundle is orientable and the second Stiefel–Whitney class of the bundle E is in the image of the map H^{2}(M, Z) → H^{2}(M, Z/2Z) (in other words, the third integral Stiefel–Whitney class vanishes, see the discussion below). In this case one says that E is spin^{C}. Intuitively, the lift gives the Chern class of the square of the U(1) part of any obtained spin^{C} bundle.

=== Classification ===
When a manifold carries a spin^{C} structure at all, the set of spin^{C} structures forms an affine space. Moreover, the set of spin^{C} structures has a free transitive action of H^{2}(M, Z). Thus, spin^{C}-structures correspond to elements of H^{2}(M, Z) although not in a natural way.

=== Geometric picture ===
This has the following geometric interpretation, which is due to Edward Witten. When the spin^{C} structure is nonzero this square root bundle has a non-integral Chern class, which means that it fails the triple overlap condition. In particular, the product of transition functions on a three-way intersection is not always equal to one, as is required for a principal bundle. Instead it is sometimes −1.

This failure occurs at precisely the same intersections as an identical failure in the triple products of transition functions of the obstructed spin bundle. Therefore, the triple products of transition functions of the full spin^{C} bundle, which are the products of the triple product of the spin and U(1) component bundles, are either 1^{2} = 1 or (−1)^{2} = 1 and so the spin^{C} bundle satisfies the triple overlap condition and is therefore a legitimate bundle.

==== The details ====
The above intuitive geometric picture may be made concrete as follows. Consider the short exact sequence 0 → Z → Z → Z_{2} → 0, where the second arrow is multiplication by 2 and the third is reduction modulo 2. This induces a long exact sequence on cohomology, which contains

$$\dots \longrightarrow \textrm H^2(M;\mathbf Z) \stackrel {2} {\longrightarrow} \textrm H^2(M;\mathbf Z) \longrightarrow \textrm H^2(M;\mathbf Z_2) \stackrel {\beta}\longrightarrow \textrm H^3(M;\mathbf Z) \longrightarrow \dots ,$$

where the second arrow is induced by multiplication by 2, the third is induced by restriction modulo 2 and the fourth is the associated Bockstein homomorphism β.

The obstruction to the existence of a spin bundle is an element w_{2} of H^{2}(M,Z_{2}). It reflects the fact that one may always locally lift an SO(n) bundle to a spin bundle, but one needs to choose a Z_{2} lift of each transition function, which is a choice of sign. The lift does not exist when the product of these three signs on a triple overlap is −1, which yields the Čech cohomology picture of w_{2}.

To cancel this obstruction, one tensors this spin bundle with a U(1) bundle with the same obstruction w_{2}. Notice that this is an abuse of the word bundle, as neither the spin bundle nor the U(1) bundle satisfies the triple overlap condition and so neither is actually a bundle.

A legitimate U(1) bundle is classified by its Chern class, which is an element of H^{2}(M,Z). Identify this class with the first element in the above exact sequence. The next arrow doubles this Chern class, and so legitimate bundles will correspond to even elements in the second H^{2}(M, Z), while odd elements will correspond to bundles that fail the triple overlap condition. The obstruction then is classified by the failure of an element in the second H^{2}(M,Z) to be in the image of the arrow, which, by exactness, is classified by its image in H^{2}(M,Z_{2}) under the next arrow.

To cancel the corresponding obstruction in the spin bundle, this image needs to be w_{2}. In particular, if w_{2} is not in the image of the arrow, then there does not exist any U(1) bundle with obstruction equal to w_{2} and so the obstruction cannot be cancelled. By exactness, w_{2} is in the image of the preceding arrow only if it is in the kernel of the next arrow, which we recall is the Bockstein homomorphism β. That is, the condition for the cancellation of the obstruction is

$$W_3=\beta w_2=0$$

where we have used the fact that the third integral Stiefel–Whitney class W_{3} is the Bockstein of the second Stiefel–Whitney class w_{2} (this can be taken as a definition of W_{3}).

==== Integral lifts of Stiefel–Whitney classes ====
This argument also demonstrates that the second Stiefel–Whitney class defines elements not only of Z_{2} cohomology but also of integral cohomology in one higher degree. In fact this is the case for all even Stiefel–Whitney classes. It is traditional to use an uppercase W for the resulting classes in odd degree, which are called the integral Stiefel–Whitney classes, and are labeled by their degree (which is always odd).

=== Examples ===
1. All oriented smooth manifolds of dimension 4 or less are spin^{C}. (In particular, by a theorem of Hopf and Hirzebruch, closed orientable 4-manifolds always admit a spin^{C} structure.)
2. All almost complex manifolds are spin^{C}.
3. All spin manifolds are spin^{C}.

== Application to particle physics ==
In particle physics the spin–statistics theorem implies that the wavefunction of an uncharged fermion can be described as a section of the associated vector bundle to the spin lift of an SO(N) bundle E. Therefore, the choice of spin structure is part of the data needed to define the wavefunction, and one often needs to sum over these choices in the partition function. In many physical theories E is the tangent bundle, but for the fermions on the worldvolumes of D-branes in string theory it is a normal bundle.

In quantum field theory charged spinors are sections of associated spin^{C} bundles, and in particular no charged spinors can exist on a space that is not spin^{C}. An exception arises in some supergravity theories where additional interactions imply that other fields may cancel the third Stiefel–Whitney class. The mathematical description of spinors in supergravity and string theory is a particularly subtle open problem, which was recently addressed in references. It turns out that the standard notion of spin structure is too restrictive for applications to supergravity and string theory, and that the correct notion of spinorial structure for the mathematical formulation of these theories is a "Lipschitz structure".

== See also ==
- G-structure on a manifold
- Metaplectic structure
- Orthonormal frame bundle
- Spinh structure
