= Spin geometry =

Area of differential geometry and topology

In mathematics, spin geometry is the area of differential geometry and topology where objects like spin manifolds and Dirac operators, and the various associated index theorems have come to play a fundamental role both in mathematics and in mathematical physics.

An important generalisation is the theory of symplectic Dirac operators in symplectic spin geometry and symplectic topology, which have become important fields of mathematical research.

== See also ==
- Contact geometry
- Symplectic topology
- Spinor
- Spinor bundle
- Spin manifold

== Books ==
- Lawson, H. Blaine; Michelsohn, Marie-Louise (1989). Spin Geometry. Princeton University Press. ISBN 978-0-691-08542-5.
- Friedrich, Thomas (2000), Dirac Operators in Riemannian Geometry, American Mathematical Society, ISBN 978-0-8218-2055-1
