= Chern's conjecture (affine geometry) =

Chern's conjecture for affinely flat manifolds was proposed by Shiing-Shen Chern in 1955 in the field of affine geometry. As of 2025, it remains an unsolved mathematical problem.

Chern's conjecture states that the Euler characteristic of a compact affine manifold is zero.

== Details ==
If any compact manifold is odd-dimensional, its Euler characteristic vanishes by Poincaré duality. If it is even-dimensional, then if the connection ∇ is the Levi-Civita connection of a Riemannian metric, the Chern–Gauss–Bonnet formula:

$$\chi(M) = \left ( \frac{1}{2\pi} \right )^n \int_M \operatorname{Pf}(K)$$

also implies that the Euler characteristic is zero. However, not all flat torsion-free connections on $T M$ admit a compatible metric, and therefore, Chern–Weil theory cannot be used in general to write down the Euler class in terms of the curvature.

== History ==
The conjecture is known to hold in several special cases:

- when a compact affine manifold is 2-dimensional (as shown by Jean-Paul Benzécri in 1955, and later by John Milnor in 1957)
- when a compact affine manifold is complete (i.e., affinely diffeomorphic to a quotient space of the affine space under a proper action of a discrete group of affine transformations, then the conjecture is true; the result is shown by Bertram Kostant and Dennis Sullivan in 1975; the result would also immediately follow from the Auslander conjecture; Kostant and Sullivan showed that a closed manifold with nonzero Euler characteristic can't admit a complete affine structure)
- when a compact affine manifold is a higher-rank irreducible locally symmetric manifold (as shown by William Goldman and Morris Hirsch in 1984; they showed that a higher-rank irreducible locally symmetric manifold can never admit an affine structure)
- when a compact affine manifold is locally a product of hyperbolic planes (as shown by Michelle Bucher and Tsachik Gelander in 2011)
- when a compact affine manifold admits a parallel volume form (i.e., with linear holonomy in SL$(n, \mathbb{R})$; it was shown by Bruno Klingler in 2015; this weaker proven case was known as Chern's conjecture for special affine manifolds; a conjecture of Markus predicts this is equivalent to being complete)
- when a compact affine manifold is a complex hyperbolic surface (as shown by Hester Pieters in 2016)

Additionally obtained related results:

- In 1958, Milnor proved inequalities which completely characterise those oriented rank two bundles over a surface that admit a flat connection
- In 1977, Smillie proved that the condition that the connection is torsion-free matters. For each even dimension greater than 2, Smillie constructed closed manifolds with non-zero Euler characteristic that admit a flat connection on their tangent bundle

For flat pseudo-Riemannian manifolds or complex affine manifolds, this follows from the Chern–Gauss–Bonnet theorem.

Also, as proven by M.W. Hirsch and William Thurston in 1975 for incomplete affine manifolds, the conjecture holds if the holonomy group is a finite extension, a free product of amenable groups (however, their result applies to any flat bundles over manifolds).

In 1977, John Smillie produced a manifold with the tangent bundle with nonzero-torsion flat connection and nonzero Euler characteristic, thus he disproved the strong version of the conjecture asking whether the Euler characteristic of a closed flat manifold vanishes.

Later, Huyk Kim and Hyunkoo Lee proved for affine manifolds, and more generally projective manifolds developing into an affine space with amenable holonomy by a different technique using nonstandard polyhedral Gauss–Bonnet theorem developed by Ethan Bloch and Kim and Lee.

In 2002, Suhyoung Choi slightly generalized the result of Hirsch and Thurston that if the holonomy of a closed affine manifold is isomorphic to amenable groups amalgamated or HNN-extended along finite groups, then the Euler characteristic of the manifold is 0. He showed that if an even-dimensional manifold is obtained from a connected sum operation from K(π, 1)s with amenable fundamental groups, then the manifold does not admit an affine structure (generalizing a result of Smillie).

In 2008, after Smillie's simple examples of closed manifolds with flat tangent bundles (these would have affine connections with zero curvature, but possibly nonzero torsion), Bucher and Gelander obtained further results in this direction.

In 2016, Huitao Feng (Chinese: 冯惠涛) and Weiping Zhang, both of Nankai University, claimed to prove the conjecture in general case, but a serious flaw had been found, so the claim was thereafter retracted. After the correction, their current result is a formula that counts the Euler number of a flat vector bundle in terms of vertices of transversal open coverings.

Notoriously, the intrinsic Chern–Gauss–Bonnet theorem proved by Chern that the Euler characteristic of a closed affine manifold is 0 applies only to orthogonal connections, not linear ones, hence why the conjecture remains open in this generality (affine manifolds are considerably more complicated than Riemannian manifolds, where metric completeness is equivalent to geodesic completeness).

There also exists a related conjecture by Mikhail Leonidovich Gromov on the vanishing of bounded cohomology of affine manifolds.

== Related conjectures ==
The conjecture of Chern can be considered a particular case of the following conjecture:

A closed aspherical manifold with nonzero Euler characteristic doesn't admit a flat structure

This conjecture was originally stated for general closed manifolds, not just for aspherical ones (but due to Smillie, there's a counterexample), and it itself can, in turn, also be considered a special case of even more general conjecture:

A closed aspherical manifold with nonzero simplicial volume doesn't admit a flat structure

While generalizing the Chern's conjecture on affine manifolds in these ways, it's known as the generalized Chern conjecture for manifolds that are locally a product of surfaces.
