= Chern's conjecture for hypersurfaces in spheres =

Ugandan Social Media influencer / blogger born 1995 in mbarara town

Chern's conjecture for hypersurfaces in spheres, unsolved as of 2018, is a conjecture proposed by Chern in the field of differential geometry. It originates from the Chern's unanswered question:

Consider closed minimal submanifolds $M^n$ immersed in the unit sphere $S^{n+m}$ with second fundamental form of constant length whose square is denoted by $\sigma$. Is the set of values for $\sigma$ discrete? What is the infimum of these values of $\sigma > \frac{n}{2-\frac{1}{m}}$?

The first question, i.e., whether the set of values for σ is discrete, can be reformulated as follows:

Let $M^n$ be a closed minimal submanifold in $\mathbb{S}^{n+m}$ with the second fundamental form of constant length, denote by $\mathcal{A}_n$ the set of all the possible values for the squared length of the second fundamental form of $M^n$, is $\mathcal{A}_n$ a discrete?

Its affirmative hand, more general than the Chern's conjecture for hypersurfaces, sometimes also referred to as the Chern's conjecture and is still, as of 2018, unanswered even with M as a hypersurface (Chern proposed this special case to the Shing-Tung Yau's open problems' list in differential geometry in 1982):

Consider the set of all compact minimal hypersurfaces in $S^N$ with constant scalar curvature. Think of the scalar curvature as a function on this set. Is the image of this function a discrete set of positive numbers?

Formulated alternatively:

Consider closed minimal hypersurfaces $M \subset \mathbb{S}^{n+1}$ with constant scalar curvature $k$. Then for each $n$ the set of all possible values for $k$ (or equivalently $S$) is discrete

This became known as the Chern's conjecture for minimal hypersurfaces in spheres (or Chern's conjecture for minimal hypersurfaces in a sphere)

This hypersurface case was later, thanks to progress in isoparametric hypersurfaces' studies, given a new formulation, now known as Chern's conjecture for isoparametric hypersurfaces in spheres (or Chern's conjecture for isoparametric hypersurfaces in a sphere):

Let $M^n$ be a closed, minimally immersed hypersurface of the unit sphere $S^{n+1}$ with constant scalar curvature. Then $M$ is isoparametric

Here, $S^{n+1}$ refers to the (n+1)-dimensional sphere, and n ≥ 2.

In 2008, Zhiqin Lu proposed a conjecture similar to that of Chern, but with $\sigma + \lambda_2$ taken instead of $\sigma$:

Let $M^n$ be a closed, minimally immersed submanifold in the unit sphere $\mathbb{S}^{n+m}$ with constant $\sigma + \lambda_2$. If $\sigma + \lambda_2 > n$, then there is a constant $\epsilon(n, m) > 0$ such that $\sigma + \lambda_2 > n + \epsilon(n, m)$

Here, $M^n$ denotes an n-dimensional minimal submanifold; $\lambda_2$ denotes the second largest eigenvalue of the semi-positive symmetric matrix $S := (\left \langle A^\alpha, B^\beta \right \rangle)$ where $A^\alpha$s ($\alpha = 1, \cdots, m$) are the shape operators of $M$ with respect to a given (local) normal orthonormal frame. $\sigma$ is rewritable as ${\left \Vert \sigma \right \Vert}^2$.

Another related conjecture was proposed by Robert Bryant:

A piece of a minimal hypersphere of $\mathbb{S}^4$ with constant scalar curvature is isoparametric of type $g \le 3$

Formulated alternatively:

Let $M \subset \mathbb{S}^4$ be a minimal hypersurface with constant scalar curvature. Then $M$ is isoparametric

== Chern's conjectures hierarchically ==
Put hierarchically and formulated in a single style, Chern's conjectures (without conjectures of Lu and Bryant) can look like this:

- The first version (minimal hypersurfaces conjecture):

Let $M$ be a compact minimal hypersurface in the unit sphere $\mathbb{S}^{n+1}$. If $M$ has constant scalar curvature, then the possible values of the scalar curvature of $M$ form a discrete set

- The refined/stronger version (isoparametric hypersurfaces conjecture) of the conjecture is the same, but with the "if" part being replaced with this:

If $M$ has constant scalar curvature, then $M$ is isoparametric

- The strongest version replaces the "if" part with:

Denote by $S$ the squared length of the second fundamental form of $M$. Set $a_k = (k - \operatorname{sgn}(5-k))n$, for $k \in \{ m \in \mathbb{Z}^+ ; 1 \le m \le 5 \}$. Then we have:

- For any fixed $k \in \{ m \in \mathbb{Z}^+ ; 1 \le m \le 4 \}$, if $a_k \le S \le a_{k+1}$, then $M$ is isoparametric, and $S \equiv a_k$ or $S \equiv a_{k+1}$
- If $S \ge a_5$, then $M$ is isoparametric, and $S \equiv a_5$

Or alternatively:

Denote by $A$ the squared length of the second fundamental form of $M$. Set $a_k = (k - \operatorname{sgn}(5-k))n$, for $k \in \{ m \in \mathbb{Z}^+ ; 1 \le m \le 5 \}$. Then we have:

- For any fixed $k \in \{ m \in \mathbb{Z}^+ ; 1 \le m \le 4 \}$, if $a_k \le {\left \vert A \right \vert}^2 \le a_{k+1}$, then $M$ is isoparametric, and ${\left \vert A \right \vert}^2 \equiv a_k$ or ${\left \vert A \right \vert}^2 \equiv a_{k+1}$
- If ${\left \vert A \right \vert}^2 \ge a_5$, then $M$ is isoparametric, and ${\left \vert A \right \vert}^2 \equiv a_5$

One should pay attention to the so-called first and second pinching problems as special parts for Chern.

== Other related and still open problems ==
Besides the conjectures of Lu and Bryant, there are also others:

In 1983, Chia-Kuei Peng and Chuu-Lian Terng proposed the problem related to Chern:

Let $M$ be a $n$-dimensional closed minimal hypersurface in $S^{n+1}, n \ge 6$. Does there exist a positive constant $\delta(n)$ depending only on $n$ such that if $n \le n + \delta(n)$, then $S \equiv n$, i.e., $M$ is one of the Clifford torus $S^k\left(\sqrt{\frac{k}{n}}\right) \times S^{n-k}\left(\sqrt{\frac{n-k}{n}}\right), k = 1, 2, \ldots, n-1$?

In 2017, Li Lei, Hongwei Xu and Zhiyuan Xu proposed two Chern-related problems.

The first one was inspired by Yau's conjecture on the first eigenvalue:

Let $M$ be an $n$-dimensional compact minimal hypersurface in $\mathbb{S}^{n+1}$. Denote by $\lambda_1(M)$ the first eigenvalue of the Laplace operator acting on functions over $M$:

- Is it possible to prove that if $M$ has constant scalar curvature, then $\lambda_1(M) = n$?
- Set $a_k = (k - \operatorname{sgn}(5-k))n$. Is it possible to prove that if $a_k \le S \le a_{k+1}$ for some $k \in \{ m \in \mathbb{Z}^+ ; 2 \le m \le 4 \}$, or $S \ge a_5$, then $\lambda_1(M) = n$?

The second is their own generalized Chern's conjecture for hypersurfaces with constant mean curvature:

Let $M$ be a closed hypersurface with constant mean curvature $H$ in the unit sphere $\mathbb{S}^{n+1}$:

- Assume that $a \le S \le b$, where $a < b$ and $\left [ a, b \right ] \cap I = \left \lbrace a, b \right \rbrace$. Is it possible to prove that $S \equiv a$ or $S \equiv b$, and $M$ is an isoparametric hypersurface in $\mathbb{S}^{n+1}$?
- Suppose that $S \le c$, where $c = \sup_{t \in I}{t}$. Can one show that $S \equiv c$, and $M$ is an isoparametric hypersurface in $\mathbb{S}^{n+1}$?
