= Chern–Gauss–Bonnet theorem =

Ties Euler characteristic of a closed even-dimensional Riemannian manifold to curvature

In mathematics, the Chern theorem (or the Chern–Gauss–Bonnet theorem after Shiing-Shen Chern, Carl Friedrich Gauss, and Pierre Ossian Bonnet) states that the Euler–Poincaré characteristic (a topological invariant defined as the alternating sum of the Betti numbers of a topological space) of a closed even-dimensional Riemannian manifold is equal to the integral of a certain polynomial (the Euler class) of its curvature form (an analytical invariant).

It is a highly non-trivial generalization of the classic Gauss–Bonnet theorem (for 2-dimensional manifolds / surfaces) to higher even-dimensional Riemannian manifolds. In 1943, Carl B. Allendoerfer and André Weil proved a special case for extrinsic manifolds. In a classic paper published in 1944, Shiing-Shen Chern proved the theorem in full generality connecting global topology with local geometry.

The Riemann–Roch theorem and the Atiyah–Singer index theorem are other generalizations of the Gauss–Bonnet theorem.

== Statement ==
One useful form of the Chern theorem is that

$$\chi(M) = \int_M e(\Omega)$$

where $\chi(M)$ denotes the Euler characteristic of $M$. The Euler class is defined as

$$e(\Omega) = \frac 1 {(2\pi)^n} \operatorname{Pf}(\Omega).$$

where we have the Pfaffian $\operatorname{Pf}(\Omega)$. Here $M$ is a compact orientable 2n-dimensional Riemannian manifold without boundary, and $\Omega$ is the associated curvature form of the Levi-Civita connection. In fact, the statement holds with $\Omega$ the curvature form of any metric connection on the tangent bundle, as well as for other vector bundles over $M$.

Since the dimension is 2n, we have that $\Omega$ is an $\mathfrak s\mathfrak o(2n)$-valued 2-differential form on $M$ (see special orthogonal group). So $\Omega$ can be regarded as a skew-symmetric 2n × 2n matrix whose entries are 2-forms, so it is a matrix over the commutative ring ${\bigwedge}^\text{even}\,T^*M$. Hence the Pfaffian is a 2n-form. It is also an invariant polynomial.

However, Chern's theorem in general is that for any closed $C^\infty$ orientable n-dimensional $M$,

$$\chi(M) = (e(TM), [M])$$

where the above pairing (,) denotes the cap product with the Euler class of the tangent bundle $TM$.

=== Proofs ===
In 1944, the general theorem was first proved by S. S. Chern in a classic paper published by the Princeton University math department.

In 2013, a proof of the theorem via supersymmetric Euclidean field theories was also found.

== Applications ==
The Chern–Gauss–Bonnet theorem can be seen as a special instance in the theory of characteristic classes. The Chern integrand is the Euler class. Since it is a top-dimensional differential form, it is closed. The naturality of the Euler class means that when changing the Riemannian metric, one stays in the same cohomology class. That means that the integral of the Euler class remains constant as the metric is varied and is thus a global invariant of the smooth structure.

The theorem has also found numerous applications in physics, including:

- adiabatic phase or Berry's phase,
- string theory,
- condensed matter physics,
- topological quantum field theory,
- topological phases of matter (see the 2016 Nobel Prize in physics by Duncan Haldane et al.).

== Special cases ==
=== Four-dimensional manifolds ===
In dimension $2n=4$, for a compact oriented manifold, we get

$$\chi(M) = \frac{1}{32\pi^2} \int_M \left( |\text{Riem}|^2 - 4 |\text{Ric}|^2 + R^2 \right) \, d\mu$$

where $\text{Riem}$ is the full Riemann curvature tensor, $\text{Ric}$ is the Ricci curvature tensor, and $R$ is the scalar curvature. This is particularly important in general relativity, where spacetime is viewed as a 4-dimensional manifold.

In terms of the orthogonal Ricci decomposition of the Riemann curvature tensor, this formula can also be written as

$$\chi(M) = \frac{1}{8\pi^2} \int_M \left( \frac{1}{4}|W|^2 - \frac{1}{2} |Z|^2 + \frac{1}{24}R^2 \right) \, d\mu$$

where $W$ is the Weyl tensor and $Z$ is the traceless Ricci tensor.

=== Even-dimensional hypersurfaces ===
For a compact, even-dimensional hypersurface $M$ in $\mathbb{R}^{n+1}$ we get

$$\int_M K\,dV = \frac{1}{2}\gamma_n\,\chi(M)$$

where $dV$ is the volume element of the hypersurface, $K$ is the Jacobian determinant of the Gauss map, and $\gamma_n$ is the surface area of the unit n-sphere.

=== Gauss–Bonnet theorem ===
The Gauss–Bonnet theorem is a special case when $M$ is a 2-dimensional manifold. It arises as the special case where the topological index is defined in terms of Betti numbers and the analytical index is defined in terms of the Gauss–Bonnet integrand.

As with the two-dimensional Gauss–Bonnet theorem, there are generalizations when $M$ is a manifold with boundary.

== Further generalizations ==
=== Atiyah–Singer ===
A far-reaching generalization of the Gauss–Bonnet theorem is the Atiyah–Singer Index Theorem.

Let $D$ be a weakly elliptic differential operator between vector bundles. That means that the principal symbol is an isomorphism. Strong ellipticity would furthermore require the symbol to be positive-definite.

Let $D^*$ be its adjoint operator. Then the analytical index is defined as

$$\dim(\ker(D))-\dim(\ker(D^*))$$

By ellipticity this is always finite. The index theorem says that this is constant as the elliptic operator is varied smoothly. It is equal to a topological index, which can be expressed in terms of characteristic classes like the Euler class.

The Chern–Gauss–Bonnet theorem is derived by considering the Dirac operator

$$D = d + d^*$$

=== Odd dimensions ===
The Chern formula is only defined for even dimensions because the Euler characteristic vanishes for odd dimensions. There is some research being done on 'twisting' the index theorem in K-theory to give non-trivial results for odd dimensions.

There is also a version of Chern's formula for orbifolds.

== History ==
Shiing-Shen Chern published his proof of the theorem in 1944 while at the Institute for Advanced Study. This was historically the first time that the formula was proven without assuming the manifold to be embedded in a Euclidean space, which is what it means by "intrinsic". The special case for a hypersurface (an (n-1)-dimensional submanifold in an n-dimensional Euclidean space) was proved by H. Hopf in which the integrand is the Gauss–Kronecker curvature (the product of all principal curvatures at a point of the hypersurface). This was generalized independently by Allendoerfer in 1939 and Fenchel in 1940 to a Riemannian submanifold of a Euclidean space of any codimension, for which they used the Lipschitz–Killing curvature (the average of the Gauss–Kronecker curvature along each unit normal vector over the unit sphere in the normal space; for an even dimensional submanifold, this is an invariant only depending on the Riemann metric of the submanifold). Their result would be valid for the general case if the Nash embedding theorem can be assumed. However, this theorem was not available then, as John Nash published his famous embedding theorem for Riemannian manifolds in 1956. In 1943 Allendoerfer and Weil published their proof for the general case, in which they first used an approximation theorem of H. Whitney to reduce the case to analytic Riemannian manifolds, then they embedded "small" neighborhoods of the manifold isometrically into a Euclidean space with the help of the Cartan–Janet local embedding theorem, so that they can patch these embedded neighborhoods together and apply the above theorem of Allendoerfer and Fenchel to establish the global result. This is, of course, unsatisfactory for the reason that the theorem only involves intrinsic invariants of the manifold, then the validity of the theorem should not rely on its embedding into a Euclidean space. Weil met Chern in Princeton after Chern arrived in August 1943. He told Chern that he believed there should be an intrinsic proof, which Chern was able to obtain within two weeks. The result is Chern's classic paper "A simple intrinsic proof of the Gauss–Bonnet formula for closed Riemannian manifolds" published in the Annals of Mathematics the next year. The earlier work of Allendoerfer, Fenchel, Allendoerfer and Weil were cited by Chern in this paper. The work of Allendoerfer and Weil was also cited by Chern in his second paper related to the same topic.

== See also ==
- Chern–Weil homomorphism
- Chern class
- Chern–Simons form
- Chern–Simons theory
- Chern's conjecture (affine geometry)
- Pontryagin number
- Pontryagin class
- De Rham cohomology
- Berry's phase
- Atiyah–Singer index theorem
- Riemann–Roch theorem
