= Robert Brown Gardner =

American mathematician

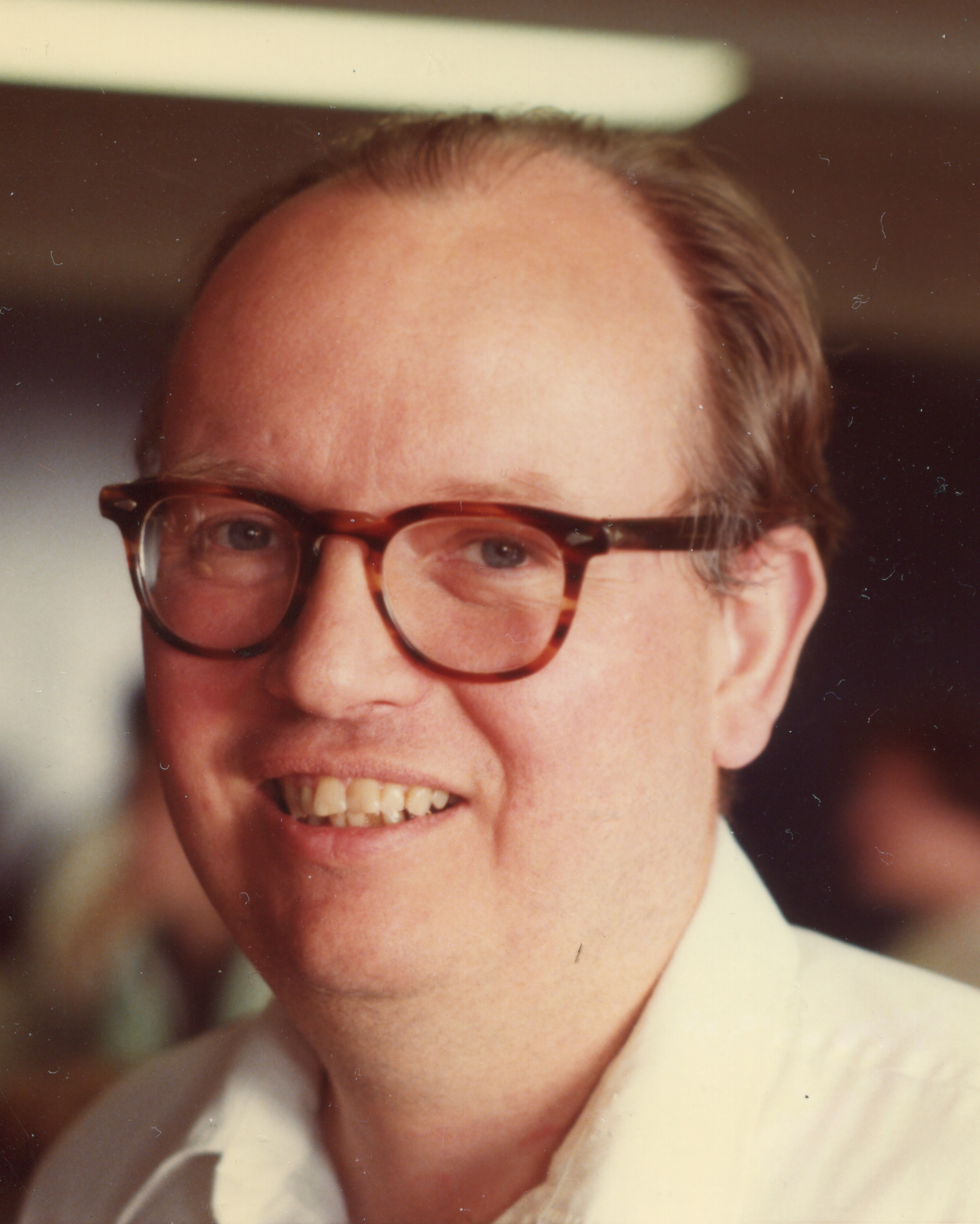
- Born: February 27, 1939; Tarrytown
- Died: May 5, 1998 (aged 59)
- Education: University of California, Berkeley
- Scientific career
- Fields: Differential geometry
- Workplaces: University of North Carolina at Chapel Hill
- Thesis: Differential Geometric Methods in Partial Differential Equations (1965)
- Doctoral advisor: Shiing-Shen Chern
- Doctoral students: Robert Bryant

Robert Brown (Robby) Gardner (Tarrytown, New York, February 27, 1939 – May 5, 1998) was an American mathematician who worked on differential geometry.

== Biography ==
Gardner graduated from Princeton University in 1959, earned a master's degree from Columbia University in 1960, and completed his PhD in 1965 from the University of California, Berkeley, under the supervision of Shiing-Shen Chern.

After this, he worked at many places, including the Institute for Advanced Study, and worked as assistant professor at Columbia University between 1967 and 1970. He joined the faculty of the University of North Carolina at Chapel Hill in 1971 and became a full professor there in 1977. He died on May 5, 1998.

== Research ==
Gardner was the author and co-author of three influential books, produced more than fifty papers, eighteen masters students and thirteen Ph.D. students. Robert Bryant, Duke University's Professor of Mathematics and the president of the American Mathematical Society (2015-2017) was a student of his.

His 1991 book, Exterior Differential Systems, coauthored with R. Bryant, S. S. Chern, H. Goldschmidt, and P. Griffiths, is the standard reference for the subject.

He is better known in the United States for his improvements and popularization of the methods of Élie Cartan (most notably, Cartan's equivalence method, an algorithmic procedure for determining if two geometric shapes are different). The works of Cartan were hard to grasp for most students, and Gardner worked to explain them in more accessible ways.

== Legacy ==
In his memory, the UNC Mathematics Department created the Robert Brown Gardner Memorial Fund, devoted to supporting graduate student activities.

== Selected publications ==
- The Method of Equivalence and Its Applications ISBN 978-0-89871-240-7
- R. Bryant, S.-S. Chern, R. B. Gardner, H. Goldschmidt, P. Griffiths, Exterior Differential Systems, MSRI Publications, Springer, 1990
- Lectures on Exterior Algebras Over Commutative Rings
- Differential Geometric Methods in Partial Differential Equations
