= Gauss–Bonnet theorem =

Theorem in differential geometry

An example of a complex region where Gauss–Bonnet theorem can apply. Shows the sign of geodesic curvature.

In differential geometry, the Gauss–Bonnet theorem (or Gauss–Bonnet formula) is a fundamental formula which links the curvature of a surface to its underlying topology.

In the simplest application, the case of a triangle on a plane, the sum of its angles is 180 degrees. The Gauss–Bonnet theorem extends this to more complicated shapes and curved surfaces, connecting the local and global geometries.

The theorem is named after Carl Friedrich Gauss, who developed a version but never published it, and Pierre Ossian Bonnet, who published a special case in 1848.

== Statement ==
Suppose M is a compact two-dimensional Riemannian manifold with boundary ∂M. Let K be the Gaussian curvature of M, and let k_{g} be the geodesic curvature of ∂M. Then

$$\int_M K\,dA+\int_{\partial M}k_g\,ds=2\pi\chi(M), \,$$

where dA is the element of area of the surface, and ds is the line element along the boundary of M. Here, χ(M) is the Euler characteristic of M.

If the boundary ∂M is piecewise smooth, then we interpret the integral ∫_{∂M} k_{g} ds as the sum of the corresponding integrals along the smooth portions of the boundary, plus the sum of the angles by which the smooth portions turn at the corners of the boundary.

Many standard proofs use the theorem of turning tangents, which states roughly that the winding number of a Jordan curve is exactly ±1.

== A simple example ==
Suppose M is the northern hemisphere cut out from a sphere of radius R. Its Euler characteristic is 1. On the left hand side of the theorem, we have $K=1/R^2$ and $k_g=0$, because the boundary is the equator and the equator is a geodesic of the sphere. Then, since M has area $\frac{4\pi R^2 }{2}$, we obtain that $\int_MK dA=2\pi$.

On the other hand, suppose we flatten the hemisphere to make it into a disk. This transformation is a homeomorphism, so the Euler characteristic is still 1. However, on the left hand side of the theorem we now have $K=0$ and $k_g=1/R$, because a circumference is not a geodesic of the plane. Then, using the theorem, we can conclude that $\int_{\partial M}k_gds=2\pi$.

Finally, take a sphere octant, also homeomorphic to the previous cases. Then $\int_MK dA=\frac{1}{R^2}\frac{4\pi R^2}{8}=\frac{\pi}{2}$. Now $k_g=0$ almost everywhere along the border, which is a geodesic triangle. But we have three right-angle corners, so $\int_{\partial M}k_gds=\frac{3\pi}{2}$. Therefore, we still have that $\int_M K\,dA+\int_{\partial M}k_g\,ds=2\pi$, as expected, since the sphere octant is homeomorphic to the previous cases.

== Interpretation and significance ==
The theorem applies in particular to compact surfaces without boundary, in which case the integral

$$\int_{\partial M}k_g\,ds$$

can be omitted. It states that the total Gaussian curvature of such a closed surface is equal to 2π times the Euler characteristic of the surface. Note that for orientable compact surfaces without boundary, the Euler characteristic equals 2 − 2g, where g is the genus of the surface: Any orientable compact surface without boundary is topologically equivalent to a sphere with some handles attached, and g counts the number of handles.

If one bends and deforms the surface M, its Euler characteristic, being a topological invariant, will not change, while the curvatures at some points will. The theorem states, somewhat surprisingly, that the total integral of all curvatures will remain the same, no matter how the deforming is done. So for instance if you have a sphere with a "dent", then its total curvature is 4π (the Euler characteristic of a sphere being 2), no matter how big or deep the dent.

If the compact surface has a boundary, the theorem states, again somewhat surprisingly, that the total curvature of the surface can be calculated from the curvature of just the boundary along with the surface's Euler characteristic.

Compactness of the surface is of crucial importance. Consider for instance the open unit disc, a non-compact Riemann surface without boundary, with curvature 0 and with Euler characteristic 1: the Gauss–Bonnet formula does not work. It holds true however for the compact closed unit disc, which also has Euler characteristic 1, because of the added boundary integral with value 2π.

As an application, a torus has Euler characteristic 0, so its total curvature must also be zero. If the torus carries the ordinary Riemannian metric from its embedding in R^{3}, then the inside has negative Gaussian curvature, the outside has positive Gaussian curvature, and the total curvature is indeed 0. It is also possible to construct a torus by identifying opposite sides of a square, in which case the Riemannian metric on the torus is flat and has constant curvature 0, again resulting in total curvature 0. It is not possible to specify a Riemannian metric on the torus with everywhere positive or everywhere negative Gaussian curvature.

== For triangles ==
Sometimes the Gauss–Bonnet formula is stated as

$$\int_T K = 2\pi - \sum \alpha - \int_{\partial T} \kappa_g,$$

where T is a geodesic triangle. Here we define a "triangle" on M to be a simply connected region whose boundary consists of three geodesics. We can then apply GB to the surface T formed by the inside of that triangle and the piecewise boundary of the triangle.

The geodesic curvature of the bordering geodesics is 0, and the Euler characteristic of T is 1.

Hence the sum of the turning angles of the geodesic triangle is equal to 2π minus the total curvature within the triangle. Since the turning angle at a corner is equal to π minus the interior angle, we can rephrase this as follows:

The sum of interior angles of a geodesic triangle is equal to π plus the total curvature enclosed by the triangle: $\sum (\pi - \alpha) = \pi + \int_T K.$

In the case of the plane (where the Gaussian curvature is 0 and geodesics are straight lines), we recover the familiar formula for the sum of angles in an ordinary triangle. On the standard sphere, where the curvature is everywhere 1, we see that the angle sum of geodesic triangles is always bigger than π.

== Special cases ==
A number of earlier results in spherical geometry and hyperbolic geometry, discovered over the preceding centuries, were subsumed as special cases of Gauss–Bonnet.

=== Triangles ===
In spherical trigonometry and hyperbolic trigonometry, the area of a triangle is proportional to the amount by which its interior angles fail to add up to 180°, or equivalently by the (inverse) amount by which its exterior angles fail to add up to 360°.

The area of a spherical triangle is proportional to its excess, by Girard's theorem – the amount by which its interior angles add up to more than 180°, which is equal to the amount by which its exterior angles add up to less than 360°.

The area of a hyperbolic triangle, conversely is proportional to its defect, as established by Johann Heinrich Lambert.

=== Polyhedra ===
Descartes' theorem on total angular defect of a polyhedron is the piecewise-linear analog: it states that the sum of the defect at all the vertices of a polyhedron which is homeomorphic to the sphere is 4π. More generally, if the polyhedron has Euler characteristic χ = 2 − 2g (where g is the genus, the "number of holes"), then the sum of the defect is 2πχ.

This is the special case of Gauss–Bonnet in which the curvature is concentrated at discrete points (the vertices). Thinking of curvature as a measure rather than a function, Descartes' theorem is Gauss–Bonnet where the curvature is a discrete measure, and Gauss–Bonnet for measures generalizes both Gauss–Bonnet for smooth manifolds and Descartes' theorem.

== Combinatorial analog ==
There are several combinatorial analogs of the Gauss–Bonnet theorem. We state the following one. Let M be a finite 2-dimensional pseudo-manifold. Let χ(v) denote the number of triangles containing the vertex v. Then

$$\sum_{v\,\in\,\operatorname{int}M}\bigl(6 - \chi(v)\bigr) + \sum_{v\,\in\,\partial M}\bigl(3 - \chi(v)\bigr) = 6\chi(M),\$$

where the first sum ranges over the vertices in the interior of M, the second sum is over the boundary vertices, and χ(M) is the Euler characteristic of M.

Similar formulas can be obtained for 2-dimensional pseudo-manifold when we replace triangles with higher polygons. For polygons of n vertices, we must replace 3 and 6 in the formula above with n/(n − 2) and 2n/(n − 2), respectively. For example, for quadrilaterals we must replace 3 and 6 in the formula above with 2 and 4, respectively. More specifically, if M is a closed 2-dimensional digital manifold, the genus turns out

$$g = 1 + \frac{M_5 + 2 M_6 - M_3}{8},$$

where M_{i} indicates the number of surface-points each of which has i adjacent points on the surface. This is the simplest formula of Gauss–Bonnet theorem in three-dimensional digital space.

== Generalizations ==
The Chern theorem (after Shiing-Shen Chern 1945) is the 2n-dimensional generalization of GB (also see Chern–Weil homomorphism).

The Riemann–Roch theorem can also be seen as a generalization of GB to complex manifolds.

A far-reaching generalization that includes all the abovementioned theorems is the Atiyah–Singer index theorem.

A generalization to 2-manifolds that need not be compact is Cohn-Vossen's inequality.

== In popular culture ==
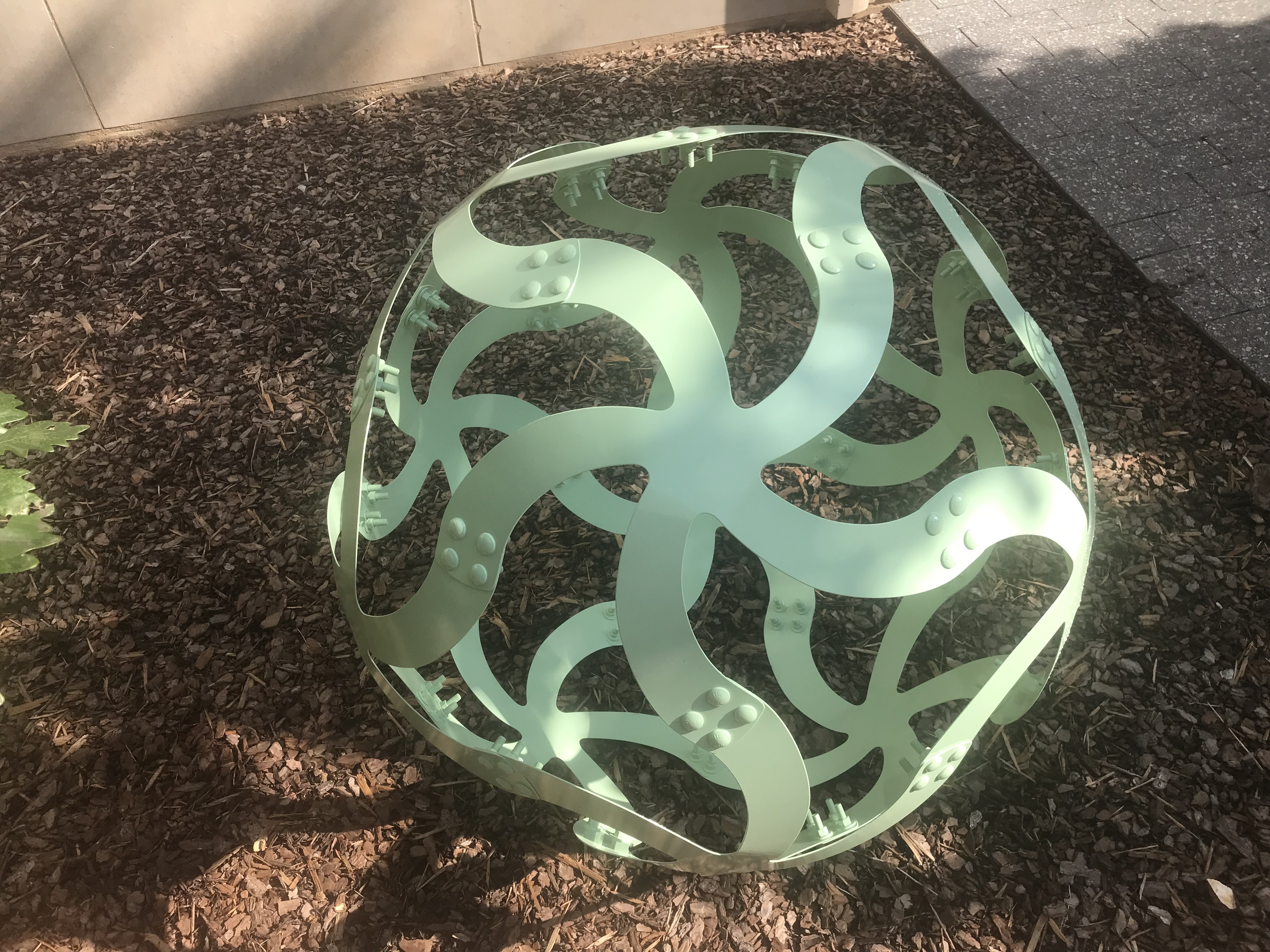
Sculpture made from flat materials using the Gauss–Bonnet Theorem

In Greg Egan's novel Diaspora, two characters discuss the derivation of this theorem.

The theorem can be used directly as a system to control sculpture - for example, in work by Edmund Harriss in the collection of the University of Arkansas Honors College.

== See also ==
- Chern–Gauss–Bonnet theorem
- Atiyah–Singer index theorem
