= Robert Bryant (mathematician) =

American mathematician (born 1953)

Robert L. Bryant
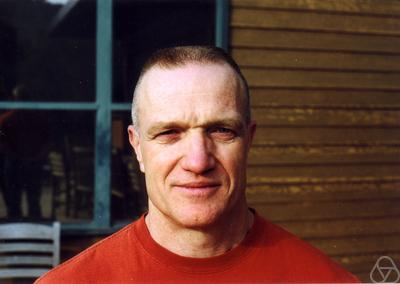
- Bryant at MSRI in 2007
- Born: Robert Leamon Bryant; August 30, 1953 (age 73); Kipling, North Carolina, U.S.
- Education: North Carolina State University at Raleigh; University of North Carolina at Chapel Hill
- Known for: Bryant surface Bryant soliton
- Awards: Sloan Research Fellowship, 1982
- Scientific career
- Fields: Mathematics
- Workplaces: Duke University; University of California, Berkeley; Rice University; Mathematical Sciences Research Institute
- Thesis: Some Aspects of the Local and Global Theory of Pfaffian Systems (1979)
- Doctoral advisor: Robert Brown Gardner
- Doctoral students: Jeanne N. Clelland
- Website: fds.duke.edu/db/aas/math/bryant

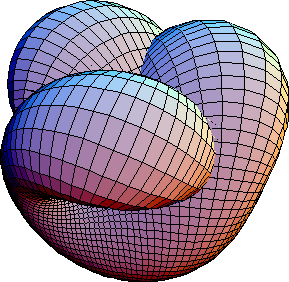
Robert Bryant, working with R. Kusner, found this parametrization of Boy's surface which minimizes the Willmore energy

Robert Leamon Bryant (born August 30, 1953) is an American mathematician. He works at Duke University and specializes in differential geometry.

== Education and career ==
Bryant grew up in a farming family in Harnett County and was a first-generation college student. He obtained a bachelor's degree at North Carolina State University at Raleigh in 1974 and a PhD at University of North Carolina at Chapel Hill in 1979. His thesis was entitled "Some Aspects of the Local and Global Theory of Pfaffian Systems" and was written under the supervision of Robert Gardner.

He worked at Rice University for seven years, as assistant professor (1979–1981), associate professor (1981–1982) and full professor (1982–1986). He then moved to Duke University, where he worked for twenty years as J. M. Kreps Professor.

Between 2007 and 2013 he worked as full professor at University of California, Berkeley, where he served as the director of the Mathematical Sciences Research Institute (MSRI). In 2013 he returned to Duke University as Phillip Griffiths Professor of Mathematics.

Bryant was awarded in 1982 a Sloan Research Fellowship. In 1986 he was invited speaker at the International Congress of Mathematicians in Berkeley.

He was elected in 2002 a fellow of the American Academy of Arts and Sciences, in 2007 a member of the National Academy of Sciences, in 2013 a fellow of the American Mathematical Society and in 2022 a fellow of the American Association for the Advancement of Science. He is also a member of the Association for Women in Mathematics, the National Association of Mathematicians and the Mathematical Association of America.

He served as the president of the American Mathematical Society for the 2-years term 2015–2016, for which he was the first openly gay president.

Bryant is on the board of directors of EDGE, a transition program for women entering graduate studies in the mathematical sciences. He is also a board member of Spectra, an association for LGBT mathematicians that he helped to create.

== Research ==
Bryant's research has been influenced by Élie Cartan, Shiing-Shen Chern, and Phillip Griffiths. His research interests cover many areas in Riemannian geometry, geometry of PDEs, Finsler geometry and mathematical physics.

In 1987 he proved several properties of surfaces of unit constant mean curvature in hyperbolic space, which are now called Bryant surfaces in his honour. In 2001 he contributed many advancements to the theory of Bochner-Kähler metrics, the class of Kähler metrics whose Bochner curvature vanishes.

In 1987 he produced the first examples of Riemannian metrics with exceptional holonomy (i.e. whose holonomy groups are G_{2} or Spin(7)); this showed that every group in Marcel Berger's classification can arise as a holonomy group. Later, he also contributed to the classification of exotic holonomy groups of arbitrary (i.e. non-Riemannian) torsion-free affine connections.

Together with Phillip Griffiths and others co-authors, Bryant developed the modern theory of Exterior Differential Systems, writing two influential monographs, which have become the standard reference in the topic. He also worked on their cohomology and applications to PDEs.

He is author of more than 60 papers, and he has supervised 26 PhD students.

== Books ==
- A sampler of Riemann-Finsler Geometry, Cambridge University Press 2004 (editor with David Bao, S. S. Chern, Zhongmin Shen)
- Exterior Differential Systems, MSRI Publ. 18, Springer Verlag 1991, ISBN 0-226-07794-2 (with Robert Brown Gardner, S. S. Chern, H. L. Goldschmidt and Phillip Griffiths)
- Exterior Differential Systems and Euler-Lagrange Partial Differential Equations, Chicago Lectures in Mathematics, University of Chicago Press 2003, ISBN 0-226-07793-4 (with Phillip Griffiths and Dan Grossman)
- Integral Geometry, Contemporary Mathematics 63, AMS 1987 (editor with Victor Guillemin, Sigurdur Helgason, R. O. Wells)
- An introduction to Lie groups and symplectic geometry, in Geometry and quantum field theory, IAS/Park City Math. Series 1, American Mathematical Society 1995, pp. 5–181
- Toward a Geometry of Differential Equations, in: Geometry, Topology & Physics, Conf. Proc. Lecture Notes Geom. Topology, VI, International Press, Cambridge, MA, 1995, pp. 1–76 (with Lucas Hsu and Phillip Griffiths)

Bryant and David Morrison are the editors of vol. 4 of the Selected Works of Phillip Griffiths.
