= Carina Curto =

American mathematician

- Born: 15 April 1978 (age 48)
- Education: Harvard University; Duke University
- Known for: Connectomics research Network Songs
- Scientific career
- Fields: Mathematics; Neuroscience
- Workplaces: Pennsylvania State University
- Thesis: Matrix Model Superpotentials and Calabi-Yau Spaces: an ADE Classification
- Doctoral advisor: David R. Morrison

Carina Curto (born 15 April 1978) is an American mathematician, a professor at Pennsylvania State University, and a Sloan Research Fellow. She is known for her work on mathematical neuroscience, including the applications of mathematics in both theoretical and computational neuroscience. Her recent work is funded by the BRAIN Initiative. She is an associate editor at SIAGA, a SIAM journal on applied algebra and geometry and on the editorial board at Physical Review Research.

== Early life and education ==
Curto was born to Argentine parents and grew up in Iowa City. She attended Iowa City West High School. During her school years, she attended courses at the University of Iowa, including advanced mathematics classes, physics, computer science, French literature, and more. In 1996, she began studying for an A.B. in Physics at Harvard University. During her time at Harvard, she was awarded prizes including the Detur Book Prize, one of Harvard's oldest awards, and the American Physical Society minority scholarship. After graduating from Harvard in 2000 and being awarded the NSF Graduate Research Fellowship, Curto started a Ph.D in mathematics at Duke University. Curto's Ph.D. focused on mathematical string theory and algebraic geometry. Her thesis was titled 'Matrix Model Superpotentials and Calabi-Yau Spaces: an ADE Classification'.

== Career and research ==
Once Curto gained her Ph.D., she moved to Rutgers University in New Jersey, working as a postdoctoral associate in a neuroscience lab at the Center for Molecular and Behavioral Neuroscience. After three years at Rutgers, she returned to working in mathematics, focusing on neuroscience from a more mathematical perspective, and moved to the Courant Institute of Mathematics at New York University, then to the University of Nebraska-Lincoln, followed by the Pennsylvania State University, and now Brown University, where she is Professor of Applied Mathematics and Brain Science in the Division of Applied Mathematics and the Carney Institute for Brain Science."Personal Website".

=== Network connectivity ===
Her research focuses on the interplay between the connectivity and dynamics of the brain and involves studying neural recordings and analysing the patterns of the activities. This network analysis aims to understand the connections between the neurons and their patterns. Traditionally, neuroscientists rely on tools from physics. But Curto's approach uses tools from pure mathematics, particularly algebraic geometry, which is applied to the activity data of the neurons. Curto's research is significant in the field of connectomics. For instance, one study showed how neural activities can drastically change by slightly changing the structure of the networks, which has implications for the study of brain disorders such as Parkinson's disease and schizophrenia.

Along with Katherine Morrison from the University of Northern Colorado, and with funding from the government's BRAIN Initiative grant and the NSF, Curto is working on Combinatorial Threshold-Linear Networks, CTLNs. These models enable the observations of emergent patterns, such as neuronal sequences and complex rhythms, and can also be used to predict features of the dynamics, something that has been seemingly difficult to predict.

Aligned with her research, Curto, alongside Morrison, also created a project called Network Songs, which originally started out as a gimmick. This is a collection of songs, that show the rhythmic activity of the networks. The basis of the songs were created by assigning a note on the piano to each neuron. Curto explains that sometimes certain patterns are better distinguished by the ear, than by the eye, hence the purpose of this particular representation of the network data.

== Awards and personal life ==
Curto has been the recipient of numerous grants and awards, including becoming a Woodrow Wilson National Fellow and an Alfred Sloan Research Fellow. Additionally, in 2012, Curto was named a UNL Academic Star. In 2021 she was named a Simons Fellow in Mathematics.

In March 2018, the American Mathematical Society, AMS, included Curto in a list of 27 female mathematicians in honour of Women's History Month, publishing a profile of her in the AMS Notices journal.

Throughout her years as a mathematician, Curto has taken part in many events and boards to promote women in mathematics. This includes being involved with the Women In Math club at UNL and being part of the Nebraska Conference for Undergraduate Women in Mathematics, NCUWM, organizing committee.

Curto is also an amateur tennis player. In 1995, when at high school, she became the Double State Champion. Furthermore, in 1996-1997 she was the Varsity Letter Winner for Women's tennis at Harvard.
