= Chern Institute of Mathematics =

Mathematical research institute in Tianjin, China

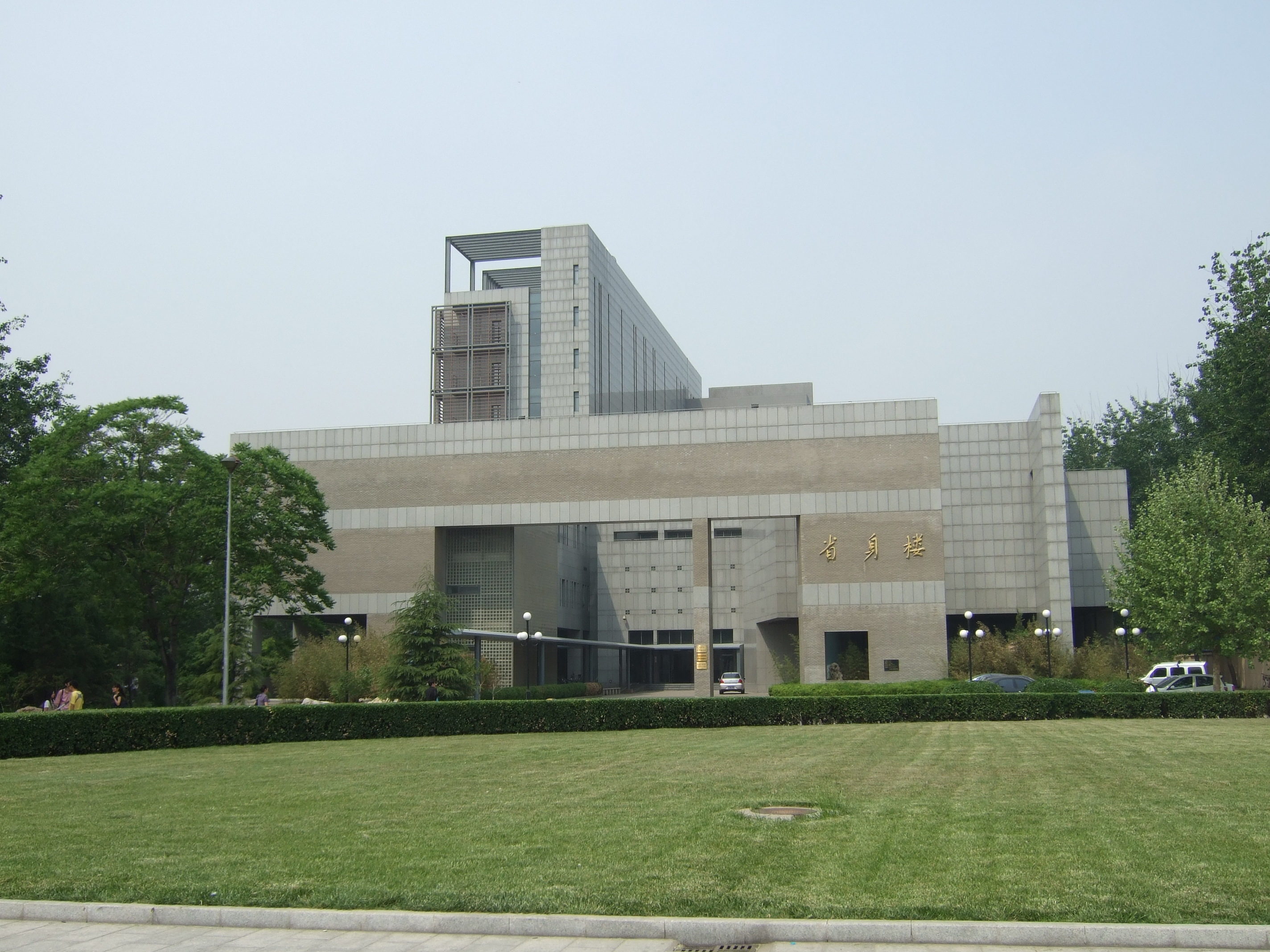
- Type: Research institute
- Established: 1985
- Director: Chengming Bai
- Location: Tianjin, China
- Website: en.cim.nankai.edu.cn

The Chern Institute of Mathematics (Chinese: 南开大学陈省身数学研究所; pinyin: Nánkāi Dàxué Chén Xǐngshēn Shùxué Yánjiūsuǒ) is a research institute at Nankai University in Tianjin, China. The Institute pursues both pure and applied mathematical research and aims to promote mathematics in China.

== History ==
Shiing-Shen Chern was invited by China's Ministry of Education to establish a new mathematics research institute at Nankai University in 1984, two years after Chern had co-founded the Mathematical Sciences Research Institute (now the Simons Laufer Mathematical Sciences Institute) in California.

The Institute was originally named the Nankai Research Institute of Mathematics and was formally opened on 17 October 1985. Chern's guiding principle for the Institute was, "based at Nankai, serving the country, and embracing the world."

Chern served as the inaugural director of the Institute until 1992. Mathematician Guoding Hu served initially as the vice director before taking over from Chern and serving as the director from April 1992 to March 1996.

During his time as director, Chern donated over 10,000 books to the Institute and also prize money of $50,000 from having been awarded the Wolf Prize in Mathematics in 1984.

Chern died on 3 December 2004 and the Institute was subsequently renamed in his honour as the Chern Institute of Mathematics.

== Theoretical Physics Division ==
At Chern's request, Yang Chen-Ning established a Theoretical Physics Division at the Institute in 1986. The initial major research direction within the Division was Yang–Mills theory and the Yang–Baxter equation. Many physicists and mathematicians from around the world have visited and given lectures at the Division, including Michael Atiyah and Freeman Dyson.

== Visiting Scholars Program ==
In May 2005, the Institute established the Visiting Scholars Program to promote communication and cooperation in mathematical research. Mathematicians from China and the rest of the world can apply to the Institute to conduct research there for a maximum of three months. More than 100 international and domestic scholars conduct research under the program each year.
