= Yau's conjecture on the first eigenvalue =

In mathematics, Yau's conjecture on the first eigenvalue is a conjecture proposed by Shing-Tung Yau in 1982; as of 2026, it remains unsolved. It asks:

Is it true that the first eigenvalue for the Laplace–Beltrami operator on an embedded closed minimal hypersurface of $S^{n+1}$ is $n$?

Here $S^{n+1}$ is the unit sphere, and first eigenvalue means the smallest non-zero eigenvalue, denoted $\lambda_1$ below. If the conjecture is true, then the Yang–Yau inequality $\lambda_1\cdot\operatorname{Area}\le 8\pi(1+\gamma)$, valid for every metric on a closed orientable surface of genus $\gamma$, implies that every closed embedded minimal surface of genus $\gamma$ in $S^3$ (such surfaces are orientable) has area at most $4\pi(1+\gamma)$; the weaker bound $8\pi(1+\gamma)$ already follows from the Choi–Wang estimate $\lambda_1\ge 1$ (see below). The conjecture has been proven in several special cases, as described below in Known cases.

A version of Chern's conjecture asserts that a closed minimal hypersurface immersed in $S^{n+1}(1)$ whose second fundamental form has constant length is isoparametric. Combined with the theorem of Tang and Yan on isoparametric hypersurfaces (see below), a positive answer would establish Yau's conjecture for every closed embedded minimal hypersurface of $S^{n+1}$ whose second fundamental form has constant length.

Tang and Yan proposed the following problem, which for $d=n\ge 3$ reduces to Yau's conjecture:

Let $M^d$ be a closed [embedded] minimal submanifold in the unit sphere $S^{n+1}(1)$ with $d \ge \tfrac{2}{3}n + 1$. Is it true that the first eigenvalue of $M^d$ is $d$?

== Known cases ==
For a closed minimal hypersurface $M^n$ immersed in the unit sphere $S^{n+1}\subset\mathbb{R}^{n+2}$, a theorem of Takahashi implies that every coordinate function of $\mathbb{R}^{n+2}$ that does not vanish identically on $M$ restricts to an eigenfunction of the Laplacian of $M$ with eigenvalue $n$. Since the coordinate functions do not all vanish identically on $M$, the inequality $\lambda_1(M)\le n$ always holds, and the conjecture asserts equality when $M$ is embedded. It has been verified in the following cases.

- Isoparametric hypersurfaces. Tang and Yan proved that $\lambda_1(M)=n$ for every closed minimal isoparametric hypersurface $M$ of $S^{n+1}$. This class includes the totally geodesic spheres and the minimal Clifford hypersurfaces $S^p\big(\sqrt{p/n}\big)\times S^{n-p}\big(\sqrt{(n-p)/n}\big)$, $1\le p\le n-1$.
- Embedded minimal surfaces of genus 0 and 1 in $S^3$. Every immersed minimal two-sphere in $S^3$ is a totally geodesic great sphere, and every embedded minimal torus in $S^3$ is congruent to the Clifford torus, by Brendle's proof of the Lawson conjecture. In both cases $\lambda_1=2$.
- Symmetric minimal surfaces in $S^3$. Choe and Soret proved that $\lambda_1=2$ for the Lawson surfaces $\xi_{m,k}$ (of genus $mk$) and for the Karcher–Pinkall–Sterling surfaces, using reflection symmetries of these surfaces.
- Doublings of the equatorial two-sphere. Kusner and McGrath proved Yau's conjecture for families of minimal doublings of the equatorial two-sphere constructed by Kapouleas and McGrath. More precisely, they showed that the first Laplace eigenspace is spanned by the coordinate functions, and hence that $\lambda_1=2$ for these surfaces. The corresponding minimal surfaces were constructed by Kapouleas and McGrath by doubling the equatorial two-sphere and joining the two sheets by families of small catenoidal bridges.

The following further cases are treated in preprints that, as of October 2026, have not been published in peer-reviewed journals.

- Surfaces obtained by eigenvalue optimization (preprint). Karpukhin, Kusner, McGrath and Stern announce the construction, for every positive genus, of embedded minimal surfaces in $S^3$ obtained by maximizing the area-normalized first eigenvalue $\lambda_1\cdot\operatorname{Area}$ among metrics invariant under suitable reflection groups; these surfaces are embedded by first eigenfunctions, so that $\lambda_1=2$. Their behaviour as the genus tends to infinity is studied in a subsequent published article.
- Doublings (preprint). Kapouleas and McGrath announce a proof that the eigenspace of the first non-zero eigenvalue is spanned by the coordinate functions, so that $\lambda_1=2$, for the side-symmetric minimal doublings of the equatorial two-sphere (those invariant under the reflection of $S^3$ fixing the equatorial two-sphere pointwise) produced by their general doubling construction, and for the minimal doublings of the Clifford torus constructed in the same article. The proof splits the eigenfunctions into even and odd parts with respect to the involution exchanging the two sheets of the doubling, treats the odd part with Courant's nodal domain theorem, and compares the even part with the spectrum of the equatorial sphere or of the Clifford torus.
- Stacked Clifford tori (preprint). Pigazzini announces a proof that $\lambda_1=2$ for the minimal surfaces constructed by Wiygul by stacking $N\ge 2$ copies of the Clifford torus, for all but finitely many values of the integer parameter $m$ of the construction, with the other parameters fixed. These surfaces resemble $N$ parallel copies of the Clifford torus joined by small catenoidal tunnels, and converge to the Clifford torus with multiplicity $N$ as $m\to\infty$. For $N \geq 3$, these configurations are chains rather than doublings; according to the author, this would be the first proof of Yau’s conjecture for chains with any prescribed finite number of Clifford-torus layers. In this multi-layer regime, the two-sheet even–odd decomposition used in the doubling case is no longer available. The proof combines the reflection lemma of Choe and Soret, analytic estimates on the tunnels and layers, and a spectral analysis of a weighted path graph whose vertices represent the layers and whose edges represent the families of tunnels. For the stacked Clifford tori constructed by Wiygul, Pigazzini's analysis shows that the balancing conditions make the total tunnel conductance compensate for the shrinking spectral gap of the path, preventing the corresponding low-energy modes from collapsing toward zero in the limiting weighted-graph model as the number of layers increases.

For general closed embedded minimal hypersurfaces $M\subset S^{n+1}$, Choi and Wang proved the lower bound $\lambda_1(M)\ge n/2$. Writing $\Lambda$ for the maximum of the length of the second fundamental form of $M$, Duncan, Sire and Spruck improved this to $\lambda_1(M)\ge \tfrac{n}{2}+\tfrac{a_n}{\Lambda^6+b_n}$, with explicit constants $a_n,b_n>0$ depending only on $n$; in a 2026 preprint, Yu announced the bound $\lambda_1(M)\ge \tfrac{n}{2}+\tfrac{n^2}{27\left(\sqrt{\Lambda^2+2n}+\Lambda\right)^2}$. For closed embedded minimal surfaces in $S^3$, Zhao proved $\lambda_1\ge 1+C\,(\cot^{-1}\lambda_{\max})^6$, where $\lambda_{\max}$ is the maximum of the principal curvatures and $C>0$ is an absolute constant.
