= Mark Lee Green =

American mathematician (born 1947)

Mark Lee Green (1 October 1947, Minneapolis) is an American mathematician, who does research in commutative algebra, algebraic geometry, Hodge theory, differential geometry, and the theory of several complex variables. He is known for Green's Conjecture on syzygies of canonical curves.

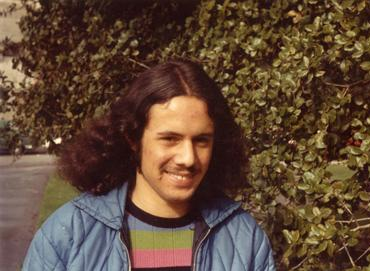
Mark Green, Berkeley 1973

Green received his bachelor's degree from MIT in 1968 and in 1972 his PhD from Princeton University under Phillip Griffiths with thesis Some Picard Theorems for Holomorphic Maps to Algebraic Varieties. In 1970/71, Green was a Procter Fellow in Princeton. He was an instructor from 1972 to 1974 at the University of California, Berkeley and for the academic year 1974/75 at MIT. He became an assistant professor in 1975, and in 1982, a full professor at UCLA. He was a co-founder and the director of the Institute for Pure and Applied Mathematics (IPAM) for 7 years, starting in 2001.

From 1968 to 1972, he was a Woodrow Wilson Fellow and from 1976 to 1980, a Sloan Fellow. In 1998, he was an Invited Speaker with Higher Abel-Jacobi Maps at the ICM in Berlin.

He is a member of The Mathematical Sciences 2025 committee of the National Academies of the USA and the committee's vice-chair with the chair Caltech's president Thomas Everhart. He was elected a Fellow of the American Academy of Arts and Sciences in 2010 and a Fellow of the American Mathematical Society in 2012.

== Selected publications ==
=== Articles ===
- "Holomorphic maps into complex projective space omitting hyperplanes." Transactions of the American Mathematical Society 169 (1972): 89–103. doi:10.1090/S0002-9947-1972-0308433-6
- "Some Picard theorems for holomorphic maps to algebraic varieties." American Journal of Mathematics (1975): 43–75. doi:10.2307/2373660
- "Holomorphic maps to complex tori." American Journal of Mathematics 100, no. 3 (1978): 615–620. doi:10.2307/2373842
- "Secant functions, the Reiss relation and its converse." Transactions of the American Mathematical Society 280, no. 2 (1983): 499–507. doi:10.1090/S0002-9947-1983-0716834-4
- "Infinitesimal methods in Hodge theory." In Algebraic cycles and Hodge theory, pp. 1–92. Springer, Berlin, Heidelberg, 1994. doi:10.1007/978-3-540-49046-3_1
- "Generic initial ideals." In Six lectures on commutative algebra, pp. 119–186. Birkhäuser, Basel, 1998. doi:10.1007/978-3-0346-0329-4_2

=== Books ===
- with P. Griffiths: On the tangent space to the space of algebraic cycles on a smooth algebraic variety, Princeton University Press 2005.
- with P. Griffiths and Matt Kerr: Hodge theory, complex geometry, and representation theory, American Mathematical Society 2013
- with P. Griffiths and Matt Kerr: Mumford-Tate groups and domains : their geometry and arithmetic, Princeton University Press 2012
