= Chern–Simons form =

Secondary characteristic classes of 3-manifolds

In mathematics, the Chern–Simons forms are certain secondary characteristic classes. The theory is named for Shiing-Shen Chern and James Harris Simons, co-authors of a 1974 paper entitled "Characteristic Forms and Geometric Invariants," from which the theory arose.

== Definition ==
Given a manifold and a Lie algebra valued 1-form $\mathbf{A}$ over it, we can define a family of p-forms:

In one dimension, the Chern–Simons 1-form is given by

$$\operatorname{Tr} [ \mathbf{A} ].$$

In three dimensions, the Chern–Simons 3-form is given by

$$\operatorname{Tr} \left[ \mathbf{F} \wedge \mathbf{A}-\frac{1}{3} \mathbf{A} \wedge \mathbf{A} \wedge \mathbf{A} \right] = \operatorname{Tr} \left[ d\mathbf{A} \wedge \mathbf{A} + \frac{2}{3} \mathbf{A} \wedge \mathbf{A} \wedge \mathbf{A}\right].$$

In five dimensions, the Chern–Simons 5-form is given by

$$\begin{align}
& \operatorname{Tr} \left[ \mathbf{F}\wedge\mathbf{F} \wedge \mathbf{A}-\frac{1}{2} \mathbf{F} \wedge\mathbf{A}\wedge\mathbf{A}\wedge\mathbf{A} +\frac{1}{10} \mathbf{A} \wedge \mathbf{A} \wedge \mathbf{A} \wedge \mathbf{A} \wedge\mathbf{A} \right] \\[6pt]
= {} & \operatorname{Tr} \left[ d\mathbf{A}\wedge d\mathbf{A} \wedge \mathbf{A} + \frac{3}{2} d\mathbf{A} \wedge \mathbf{A} \wedge \mathbf{A} \wedge \mathbf{A} +\frac{3}{5} \mathbf{A} \wedge \mathbf{A} \wedge \mathbf{A}\wedge\mathbf{A}\wedge\mathbf{A} \right]
\end{align}$$

where the curvature F is defined as

$$\mathbf{F} = d\mathbf{A}+\mathbf{A}\wedge\mathbf{A}.$$

The general Chern–Simons form $\omega_{2k-1}$ is defined in such a way that

$$d\omega_{2k-1}= \operatorname{Tr}(F^k),$$

where the wedge product is used to define F^{k}. The right-hand side of this equation is proportional to the k-th Chern character of the connection $\mathbf{A}$.

In general, the Chern–Simons p-form is defined for any odd p.

== Application to physics ==
In 1978, Albert Schwarz formulated Chern–Simons theory, early topological quantum field theory, using Chern-Simons forms.

In the gauge theory, the integral of Chern-Simons form is a global geometric invariant, and is typically gauge invariant modulo addition of an integer.

== See also ==
- Chern–Weil homomorphism
- Chiral anomaly
- Jones polynomial
- Topological quantum field theory
