= Antonella Grassi =

Italian mathematician

- Education: Duke University, 1990
- Scientific career
- Fields: Mathematics
- Workplaces: University of Pennsylvania Providence; University of Bologna
- Doctoral advisor: David R. Morrison

Antonella Grassi is an Italian mathematician specializing in algebraic geometry and string theory. She is a Fellow of the American Mathematical Society.

== Education ==
Grassi received her Ph.D. from Duke University under the supervision of David R. Morrison. Her dissertation was entitled "Minimal Models of Elliptic Threefolds."

== Career and service ==
Grassi is currently Professor of Mathematics at Univeristà degli studi di Bologna. She has supervised two doctoral students, one at the University of Pennsylvania and the other at Università di Torino in Torino. She is an active participant in Women in Math at the University of Pennsylvania.

Grassi has been a leader and mentor in the Institute for Advanced Study Program for Women in Mathematics; in particular, she organized the 2007 program on Algebraic Geometry and Group Actions.

== Honors ==
Grassi was elected to the 2018 class of fellows of the American Mathematical Society. Her citation read "For contributions to algebraic geometry and mathematical physics, and for leadership in mentoring programs."
