= Mary Lou Zeeman =

British mathematician

Mary Lou Zeeman is a British mathematician at Bowdoin College in the United States, where she is R. Wells Johnson Professor of Mathematics. She specializes in dynamical systems and their application to mathematical biology; she helped found the SIAM Activity Group on the Mathematics of Planet Earth, and co-directs the Mathematics and Climate Research Network.

Zeeman is the daughter of British mathematician Christopher Zeeman. She was educated at the University of Oxford, and earned her PhD in 1989 from the University of California, Berkeley under the supervision of Morris Hirsch. Before moving to Bowdoin in 2006, she spent 15 years on the faculty of the University of Texas at San Antonio.
