= Morris Hirsch =

American mathematician

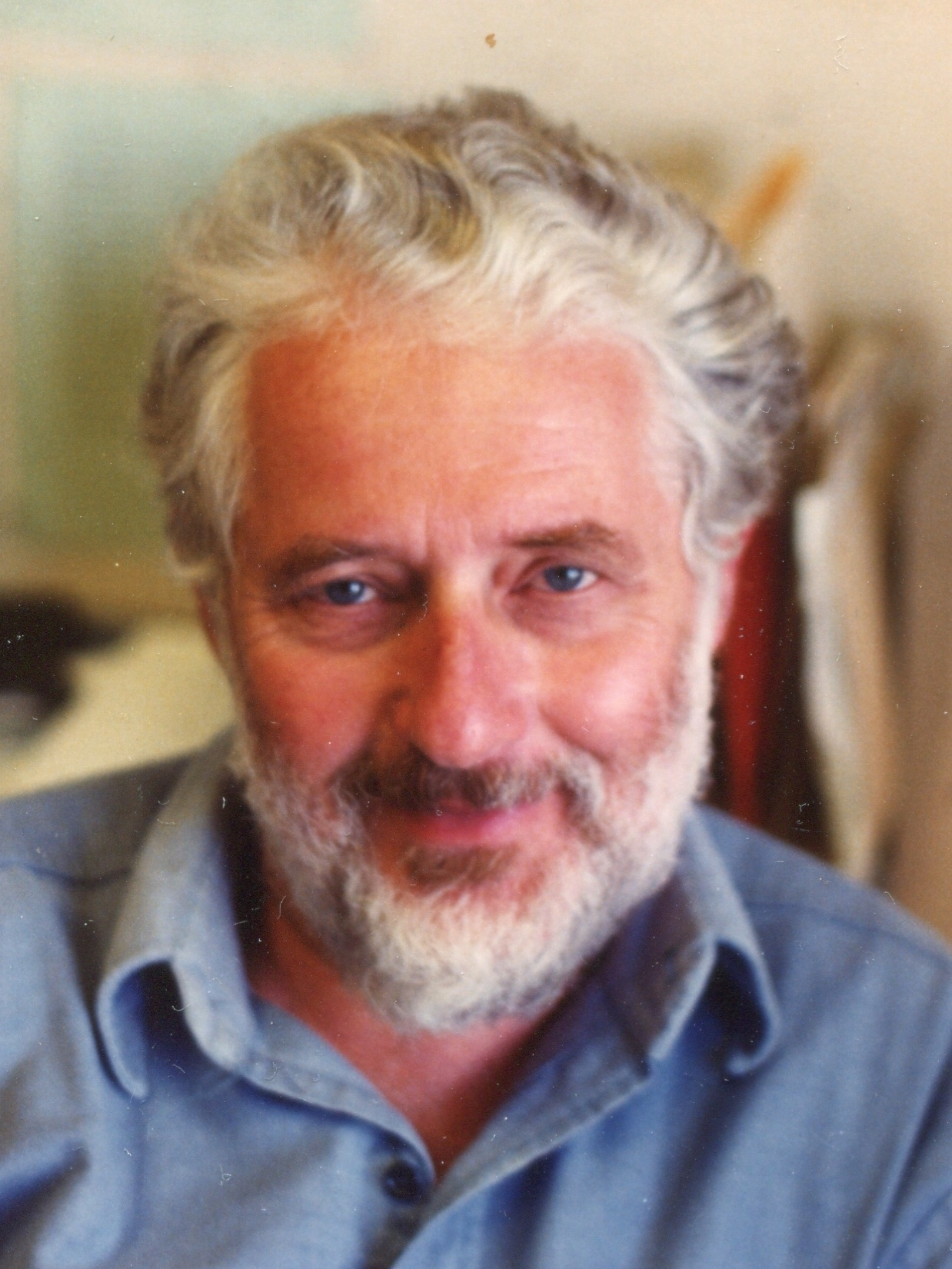
- Hirsch in Berkeley, 1986
- Born: June 28, 1933 (age 93); Chicago, Illinois, U.S.
- Education: University of Chicago
- Scientific career
- Fields: Mathematics
- Workplaces: University of California, Berkeley
- Doctoral advisors: Edwin Spanier; Stephen Smale
- Doctoral students: William Goldman; William Thurston; Mary Lou Zeeman

Morris William Hirsch (born June 28, 1933) is an American mathematician, formerly at the University of California, Berkeley.

A native of Chicago, Illinois, Hirsch attained his doctorate from the University of Chicago in 1958, under supervision of Edwin Spanier and Stephen Smale. His thesis was entitled Immersions of Manifolds. In 2012, he became a fellow of the American Mathematical Society.

Hirsch had 23 doctoral students, including William Thurston, William Goldman, and Mary Lou Zeeman.

== Selected works ==
- with Stephen Smale and Robert L. Devaney: Differential equations, dynamical systems and an introduction to chaos, Academic Press 2004 (2nd edition) 3rd edition, 2013
- with Stephen Smale: Differential equations, dynamical systems and linear algebra, Academic Press 1974
- Differential Topology, Springer 1976, 1997
- with Barry Mazur: Smoothings of piecewise linear manifolds, Princeton University Press 1974
- with Charles C. Pugh, Michael Shub: Invariant Manifolds, Springer 1977

== See also ==
- Brouwer fixed-point theorem
- Chern's conjecture (affine geometry)
- Differential structure
- Homotopy principle
- Immersion (mathematics)
- Whitney embedding theorem
- Cr section theorem - a mathematical result related to invariant manifolds. It was published by Morris W. Hirsch, Charles C. Pugh, and Michael Shub in 1971. The theorem is used in the study of dynamical systems and differential equations
