= David R. Morrison (mathematician) =

American mathematician

David Robert Morrison (born July 29, 1955, in Oakland, California) is an American mathematician and theoretical physicist. He works on string theory and algebraic geometry, especially its relations to theoretical physics.

Morrison studied at Princeton University with bachelor's degree in 1976 and at Harvard University with master's degree in 1977 and PhD under Phillip Griffiths in 1980 with thesis Semistable Degenerations of Enriques' and Hyperelliptic Surfaces. From 1980 he was an instructor and from 1982 an assistant professor at Princeton University and in the academic year 1984–1985 a visiting scientist at the University of Kyoto (as Fellow der Japan Society for the Promotion of Science). In 1986 he became an associate professor and in 1992 a professor of mathematics at Duke University and then in 1997 "James B. Duke Professor of Mathematics and Physics". While at Duke, Morrison advised multiple PhD students, including Antonella Grassi and Carina Curto. Since 2006 he has been a professor at the University of California, Santa Barbara.

Although Morrison began his career as a mathematician in classical algebraic geometry, in his later career he has also been a string theorist. He works on the interfaces and mutual fertilization of algebraic geometry and string theory, especially mirror symmetry.

In 1992–1993, 1996–1997 and 2000 he was at the Institute for Advanced Study. In 1995 he was a visiting professor at Cornell University, in 2005 at the Kavli Institute for Theoretical Physics, and in 2006 a research professor at MSRI.

In 2015 he became a member of the American Academy of Arts and Sciences, in 2013 a Fellow of the American Mathematical Society, in 2005 a Senior Scholar at the Clay Mathematics Institute and in 2005–2006 a Guggenheim Fellow.

He is a co-editor of selected works of his thesis supervisor Phillip Griffiths.

Morrison was an invited speaker at the International Congress of Mathematicians in Zürich in 1994 (Mirror Symmetry and Moduli Spaces of Superconformal Field Theories).

== Works ==
- Quantum field theory, supersymmetry, and enumerative geometry. Freed, Daniel S. and Morrison, David R. and Singer, Isadore editors. IAS/Park City Mathematics Series, Vol. 11. American Mathematical Society Providence, RI viii+285. Papers from the Graduate Summer School of the IAS/Park City Mathematics Institute held in Princeton, NJ, 2001. (2006)
- Quantum fields and strings: a course for mathematicians. Vol. 1, 2. Material from the Special Year on Quantum Field Theory held at the Institute for Advanced Study, Princeton, NJ, 1996–1997. Edited by Pierre Deligne, Pavel Etingof, Daniel S. Freed, Lisa C. Jeffrey, David Kazhdan, John W. Morgan, David R. Morrison and Edward Witten. American Mathematical Society, Providence, RI; Institute for Advanced Study (IAS), Princeton, NJ, 1999. Vol. 1: xxii+723 pp.; Vol. 2: pp. i--xxiv and 727–1501. ISBN 0-8218-1198-3, 81-06 (81T30 81Txx)
- Mirror symmetry and rational curves on quintic threefolds: A guide for mathematicians, J. Amer. Math. Soc. 6, 1993, 223–247, MR1179538
- Mathematical aspects of mirror symmetry, in János Kollár (ed.) Complex Algebraic Geometry, IAS/Park City Math. Series, Vol. 3, 1997, pp. 265–340.
- Mathematical Aspects of Mirror Symmetry, in Björn Engquist, Wilfried Schmid Mathematics Unlimited, Springer Verlag 2001, Arxiv.org
