= William Goldman (mathematician) =

American mathematician

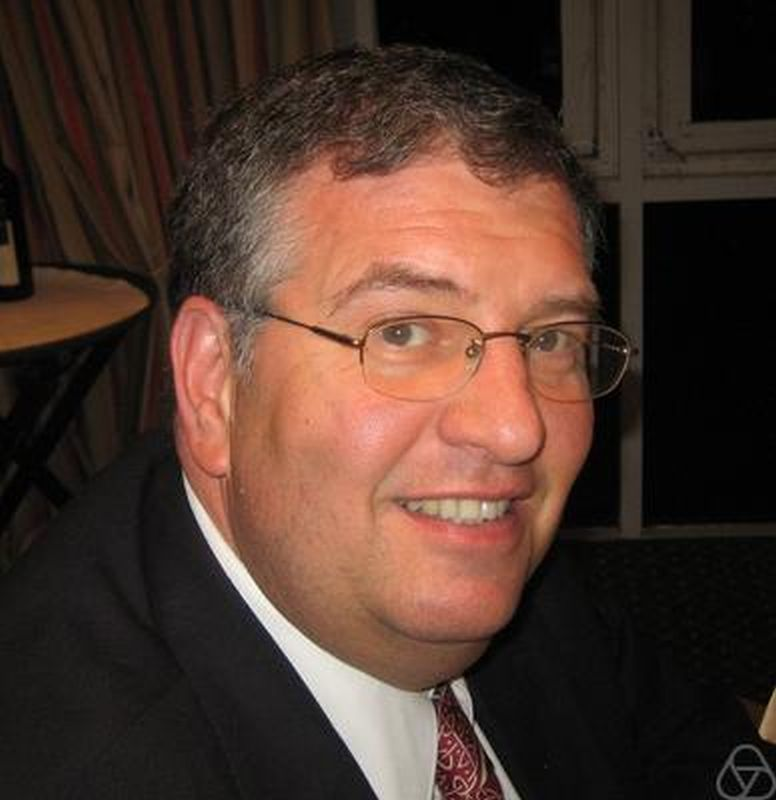
- William Goldman at Bar-Ilan University in 2008
- Born: November 17, 1955 (age 70); Kansas City, United States
- Education: Princeton University; University of California, Berkeley
- Scientific career
- Fields: Mathematics
- Workplaces: University of Maryland-College Park
- Doctoral advisors: Morris Hirsch; William Thurston

William Mark Goldman (born 1955 in Kansas City, Missouri) is a professor of mathematics at the University of Maryland, College Park (since 1986). He received a B.A. in mathematics from Princeton University in 1977, and a Ph.D. in mathematics from the University of California, Berkeley in 1980.

== Research contributions ==
Goldman has investigated geometric structures, in various incarnations, on manifolds since his undergraduate thesis, "Affine manifolds and projective geometry on manifolds", supervised by William Thurston and Dennis Sullivan. This work led to work with Morris Hirsch and David Fried on affine structures on manifolds, and work in real projective structures on compact surfaces. In particular he proved that the space of convex real projective structures on a closed orientable surface of genus $g > 1$ is homeomorphic to an open cell of dimension $16g-16$. With Suhyoung Choi, he proved that this space is a connected component (the "Hitchin component") of the space of equivalence classes of representations of the fundamental group in ${\rm SL}(3,\R)$. Combining this result with Suhyoung Choi's convex decomposition theorem, this led to a complete classification of convex real projective structures on compact surfaces

His doctoral dissertation, "Discontinuous groups and the Euler class" (supervised by Morris W. Hirsch), characterizes discrete embeddings of surface groups in ${\rm PSL}(2,\R)$ in terms of maximal Euler class, proving a converse to the Milnor–Wood inequality for flat bundles. Shortly thereafter he showed that the space of representations of the fundamental group of a closed orientable surface of genus $g>1$ in ${\rm PSL}(2,\R)$ has $4g-3$ connected components, distinguished by the Euler class.

With David Fried, he classified compact quotients of Euclidean 3-space by discrete groups of affine transformations, showing that all such manifolds are finite quotients of torus bundles over the circle. The noncompact case is much more interesting, as Grigory Margulis found complete affine manifolds with nonabelian free fundamental group. In his 1990 doctoral thesis, Todd Drumm found examples which are solid handlebodies using polyhedra which have since been called "crooked planes."

Goldman found examples (non-Euclidean nilmanifolds and solvmanifolds) of closed 3-manifolds which fail to admit flat conformal structures.

Generalizing Scott Wolpert's work on the Weil–Petersson symplectic structure on the space of hyperbolic structures on surfaces, he found an algebraic-topological description of a symplectic structure on spaces of representations of a surface group in a reductive Lie group. Traces of representations of the corresponding curves on the surfaces generate a Poisson algebra, whose Lie bracket has a topological description in terms of the intersections of curves. Furthermore, the Hamiltonian vector fields of these trace functions define flows generalizing the Fenchel–Nielsen flows on Teichmüller space. This symplectic structure is invariant under the natural action of the mapping class group, and using the relationship between Dehn twists and the generalized Fenchel–Nielsen flows, he proved the ergodicity of the action of the mapping class group on the SU(2)-character variety with respect to symplectic Lebesgue measure.

Following suggestions of Pierre Deligne, he and John Millson proved that the variety of representations of the fundamental group of a compact Kähler manifold has singularities defined by systems of homogeneous quadratic equations. This leads to various local rigidity results for actions on Hermitian symmetric spaces.

With John Parker, he examined the complex hyperbolic ideal triangle group representations. These are representations of hyperbolic ideal triangle groups to the group of holomorphic isometries of the complex hyperbolic plane such that each standard generator of the triangle group maps to a complex reflection and the products of pairs of generators to parabolics. The space of representations for a given triangle group (modulo conjugacy) is parametrized by a half-open interval. They showed that the representations in a particular range were discrete and conjectured that a representation would be discrete if and only if it was in a specified larger range. This has become known as the Goldman–Parker conjecture and was eventually proven by Richard Schwartz.

== Experimental Geometry Lab ==
Goldman heads a research group at the University of Maryland called the Experimental Geometry Lab, a team developing software (primarily in Mathematica) to explore geometric structures and dynamics in low dimensions.

== Awards and honors ==
In 2012 he became a fellow of the American Mathematical Society.

In 1987 he was awarded a Sloan Foundation Fellowship.

He gave an invited address at the 2010 International Congress of Mathematicians in Hyderabad, India.

In 2007 he was awarded a Distinguished Scholar-Teacher Award from the University of Maryland.

In 2016 he became a Fellow of the Washington Academy of Sciences.

== Publications ==
- Fried, David; Goldman, William M. (1983). "Three-dimensional affine crytallographic groups". Advances in Mathematics. 47 (1): 1–49. doi:10.1016/0001-8708(83)90053-1.
- Goldman, William M. (1983). "Conformally flat manifolds with nilpotent holonomy and the uniformization problem for 3-manifolds". Transactions of the American Mathematical Society. 278 (2): 573–583. doi:10.1090/S0002-9947-1983-0701512-8. JSTOR 1999172.
- Goldman, William M. (1984). "The symplectic nature of fundamental groups of surfaces". Advances in Mathematics. 54 (2): 200–225. doi:10.1016/0001-8708(84)90040-9.
- Goldman, William M. (1986). "Invariant functions on Lie groups and Hamiltonian flows of surface group representations". Inventiones mathematicae. 85 (2): 1–40. doi:10.1007/BF01389091.
- Goldman, William M. (1988). "Topological components of spaces of representations". Inventiones mathematicae. 93 (3): 557–607. doi:10.1007/BF01410200.
- Goldman, William M.; Millson, John J. (1988). "The deformation theory of representations of fundamental groups of compact Kähler manifolds". Publications Mathématiques de l'IHÉS. 67: 43–96. doi:10.1007/BF02699127.
- Millson, John J. (1991). "Rational Homotopy Theory and Deformation Problems from Algebraic Geometry". Proceedings of the International Congress of Mathematicians, August 21–29, 1990, Kyoto, Japan. 1: 549–558.
- Goldman, William M.; Parker, John R. (1992). "Complex hyperbolic ideal triangle groups". Journal für die reine und angewandte Mathematik. 425: 71–86. doi:10.1515/crll.1992.425.71.
- Goldman, William M. (1997). "Ergodic theory on moduli spaces". Annals of Mathematics. 146 (3): 1–33. doi:10.2307/2952454.
- Choi, Suhyoung; Goldman, William M. (1997). "The Classification of Real Projective Structures on compact surfaces". Bulletin of the American Mathematical Society. 34 (2): 161–170. doi:10.1090/S0273-0979-97-00711-8.
- Goldman, William M. (1999). Complex hyperbolic geometry. Oxford Mathematical Monographs. Oxford Science Publications. New York: The Clarendon Press, Oxford University Press. xx+316 pp. ISBN 0-19-853793-X. MR 1695450.
- Goldman, William M.; Xia, Eugene Z. (2008). "Rank one Higgs bundles and representations of fundamental groups of Riemann surfaces". Memoirs of the American Mathematical Society. 193 (904): viii+69 pp. arXiv:math/0402429. doi:10.1090/memo/0904. ISSN 0065-9266. MR 2400111. S2CID 2865489.
- Goldman, William M.; Labourie, François; Margulis, Gregory (2009). "Proper affine actions and geodesic flows on hyperbolic surfaces". Annals of Mathematics. 170 (3): 1051–1083. arXiv:math/0406247. doi:10.4007/annals.2009.170.1051.
- Athreya, Jayadev; Dumas, David; Goldman, William; Grigorian, Sergey; Guzman, Rosemary; Hieronymi, Philipp; Lawton, Sean; Lukyanenko, Anton; Tyson, Jeremy; Wilson, Aaron (2018). "Geometry Labs United: An introduction". Notices of the American Mathematical Society. 65 (9): 1088–1094. doi:10.1090/noti1733.
- Goldman, William M. (2022). Geometric Structures on Manifolds. Graduate Studies in Mathematics. Vol. 227. American Mathematical Society. pp. li+409pp. ISBN 978-1-4704-7198-9. MR 4500072.
