= Chern–Weil homomorphism =

Mathematical theory

In mathematics, the Chern–Weil homomorphism is a basic construction in Chern–Weil theory that computes topological invariants of vector bundles and principal bundles on a smooth manifold M in terms of connections and curvature representing classes in the de Rham cohomology rings of M. That is, the theory forms a bridge between the areas of algebraic topology and differential geometry. It was developed in the late 1940s by Shiing-Shen Chern and André Weil, in the wake of proofs of the generalized Gauss–Bonnet theorem. This theory was an important step in the theory of characteristic classes.

Let G be a real or complex Lie group with Lie algebra $\mathfrak g$, and let $\Complex[\mathfrak g]$ denote the algebra of $\Complex$-valued polynomials on $\mathfrak g$ (exactly the same argument works if we used $\R$ instead of $\Complex$). Let $\Complex[\mathfrak g]^G$ be the subalgebra of fixed points in $\Complex[\mathfrak g]$ under the adjoint action of G; that is, the subalgebra consisting of all polynomials f such that $f(\operatorname{Ad}_g x) = f(x)$, for all g in G and x in $\mathfrak{g}$,

Given a principal G-bundle P on M, there is an associated homomorphism of $\Complex$-algebras,

$$\Complex[\mathfrak g]^{G} \to H^*(M; \Complex)$$,

called the Chern–Weil homomorphism, where on the right cohomology is de Rham cohomology. This homomorphism is obtained by taking invariant polynomials in the curvature of any connection on the given bundle. If G is either compact or semi-simple, then the cohomology ring of the classifying space for G-bundles, $BG$, is isomorphic to the algebra $\Complex[\mathfrak g]^{G}$ of invariant polynomials:

$$H^*(BG; \Complex) \cong \Complex[\mathfrak g]^{G}.$$

(The cohomology ring of BG can still be given in the de Rham sense:

$$H^k(BG; \Complex) = \varinjlim \operatorname{ker} (d\colon \Omega^k(B_jG) \to \Omega^{k+1}(B_jG))/\operatorname{im} d.$$

when $BG = \varinjlim B_jG$ and $B_jG$ are manifolds.)

== Definition of the homomorphism ==
Choose any connection form ω in P, and let Ω be the associated curvature form; i.e., $\Omega = D\omega$, the exterior covariant derivative of ω. If $f\in\mathbb C[\mathfrak g]^G$ is a homogeneous polynomial function of degree k; i.e., $f(a x) = a^k f(x)$ for any complex number a and x in $\mathfrak g$, then, viewing f as a symmetric multilinear functional on $\prod_1^k \mathfrak{g}$ (see the ring of polynomial functions), let $f(\Omega)$ be the (scalar-valued) 2k-form on P given by

$$f(\Omega)(v_1,\dots,v_{2k})=\frac{1}{(2k)!}\sum_{\sigma\in\mathfrak S_{2k}}\epsilon_\sigma f(\Omega(v_{\sigma(1)},v_{\sigma(2)}),\dots,\Omega(v_{\sigma(2k-1)}, v_{\sigma(2k)}))$$

where v_{i} are tangent vectors to P, $\epsilon_\sigma$ is the sign of the permutation $\sigma$ in the symmetric group on 2k numbers $\mathfrak S_{2k}$ (see Lie algebra-valued forms#Operations as well as Pfaffian).

If, moreover, f is invariant; i.e., $f(\operatorname{Ad}_g x) = f(x)$, then one can show that $f(\Omega)$ is a closed form, it descends to a unique form on M and that the de Rham cohomology class of the form is independent of $\omega$. First, that $f(\Omega)$ is a closed form follows from the next two lemmas:

Lemma 1: The form $f(\Omega)$ on P descends to a (unique) form $\overline{f}(\Omega)$ on M; i.e., there is a form on M that pulls-back to $f(\Omega)$.
Lemma 2: If a form of $\varphi$ on P descends to a form on M, then $d\varphi = D\varphi$.

Indeed, Bianchi's second identity says $D \Omega = 0$ and, since D is a graded derivation, $D f(\Omega) = 0.$ Finally, Lemma 1 says $f(\Omega)$ satisfies the hypothesis of Lemma 2.

To see Lemma 2, let $\pi\colon P \to M$ be the projection and h be the projection of $T_u P$ onto the horizontal subspace. Then Lemma 2 is a consequence of the fact that $d \pi(h v) = d \pi(v)$ (the kernel of $d \pi$ is precisely the vertical subspace.) As for Lemma 1, first note

$$f(\Omega)(d R_g(v_1), \dots, d R_g(v_{2k})) = f(\Omega)(v_1, \dots, v_{2k}), \, R_g(u) = ug;$$

which is because $R_g^* \Omega = \operatorname{Ad}_{g^{-1}} \Omega$ and f is invariant. Thus, one can define $\overline{f}(\Omega)$ by the formula:

$$\overline{f}(\Omega)(\overline{v_1}, \dots, \overline{v_{2k}}) = f(\Omega)(v_1, \dots, v_{2k}),$$

where $v_i$ are any lifts of $\overline{v_i}$: $d \pi(v_i) = \overline{v}_i$.

Next, we show that the de Rham cohomology class of $\overline{f}(\Omega)$ on M is independent of a choice of connection. Let $\omega_0, \omega_1$ be arbitrary connection forms on P and let $p\colon P \times \R \to P$ be the projection. Put

$$\omega' = t \, p^* \omega_1 + (1 - t) \, p^* \omega_0$$

where t is a smooth function on $P \times \mathbb{R}$ given by $(x, s) \mapsto s$. Let $\Omega', \Omega_0, \Omega_1$ be the curvature forms of $\omega', \omega_0, \omega_1$. Let $i_s: M \to M \times \mathbb{R}, \, x \mapsto (x, s)$ be the inclusions. Then $i_0$ is homotopic to $i_1$. Thus, $i_0^* \overline{f}(\Omega')$ and $i_1^* \overline{f}(\Omega')$ belong to the same de Rham cohomology class by the homotopy invariance of de Rham cohomology. Finally, by naturality and by uniqueness of descending,

$$i_0^* \overline{f}(\Omega') = \overline{f}(\Omega_0)$$

and the same for $\Omega_1$. Hence, $\overline{f}(\Omega_0), \overline{f}(\Omega_1)$ belong to the same cohomology class.

The construction thus gives the linear map: (cf. Lemma 1)

$$\Complex[\mathfrak g]^{G}_k \to H^{2k}(M; \Complex), \, f \mapsto \left[\overline{f}(\Omega)\right].$$

In fact, one can check that the map thus obtained:

$$\Complex[\mathfrak g]^{G} \to H^*(M; \Complex)$$

is an algebra homomorphism.

== Example: Chern classes and Chern character ==
Let $G = \operatorname{GL}_n(\Complex)$ and $\mathfrak{g} = \mathfrak{gl}_n(\Complex)$ its Lie algebra. For each $x \in \mathfrak{g}$, we can consider its characteristic polynomial in t:

$$\det \left( I - t{x \over 2 \pi i} \right) = \sum_{k=0}^n f_k(x) t^k,$$

where i is the square root of -1. Then $f_k$ are invariant polynomials on $\mathfrak{g}$, since the left-hand side of the equation is. The k-th Chern class of a smooth complex-vector bundle E of rank n on a manifold M:

$$c_k(E) \in H^{2k}(M, \Z)$$

is given as the image of $f_k$ under the Chern–Weil homomorphism defined by E (or more precisely the frame bundle of E). If t = 1, then $\det \left(I - {x \over 2 \pi i} \right) = 1 + f_1(x) + \cdots + f_n(x)$ is an invariant polynomial. The total Chern class of E is the image of this polynomial; that is,

$$c(E) = 1 + c_1(E) + \cdots + c_n(E).$$

Directly from the definition, one can show that $c_j$ and c given above satisfy the axioms of Chern classes. For example, for the Whitney sum formula, we consider

$$c_t(E) = [\det \left( I - t {\Omega / 2 \pi i} \right)],$$

where we wrote $\Omega$ for the curvature 2-form on M of the vector bundle E (so it is the descendent of the curvature form on the frame bundle of E). The Chern–Weil homomorphism is the same if one uses this $\Omega$. Now, suppose E is a direct sum of vector bundles $E_i$'s and $\Omega_i$ the curvature form of $E_i$ so that, in the matrix term, $\Omega$ is the block diagonal matrix with Ω_{I}'s on the diagonal. Then, since $\det(I - t\frac\Omega{2\pi i}) = \det(I - t\frac{\Omega_1}{2\pi i}) \wedge \dots \wedge \det(I - t\frac{\Omega_m}{2\pi i})$, we have:

$$c_t(E) = c_t(E_1) \cdots c_t(E_m)$$

where on the right the multiplication is that of a cohomology ring: cup product. For the normalization property, one computes the first Chern class of the complex projective line; see Chern class#Example: the complex tangent bundle of the Riemann sphere.

Since $\Omega_{E \otimes E'} = \Omega_E \otimes I_{E'} + I_{E} \otimes \Omega_{E'}$, we also have:

$$c_1(E \otimes E') = c_1(E) \operatorname{rank} (E') + \operatorname{rank}(E) c_1(E').$$

Finally, the Chern character of E is given by

$$\operatorname{ch}(E) = [\operatorname{tr}(e^{-\Omega/2\pi i})] \in H^*(M, \Q)$$

where $\Omega$ is the curvature form of some connection on E (since $\Omega$ is nilpotent, it is a polynomial in $\Omega$.) Then ch is a ring homomorphism:

$$\operatorname{ch}(E \oplus F) = \operatorname{ch}(E) + \operatorname{ch}(F), \, \operatorname{ch}(E \otimes F) = \operatorname{ch}(E) \operatorname{ch}(F).$$

Now suppose, in some ring R containing the cohomology ring $H^*(M, \Complex)$, there is the factorization of the polynomial in t:

$$c_t(E) = \prod_{j=0}^n (1 + \lambda_j t)$$

where $\lambda_j$ are in R (they are sometimes called Chern roots.) Then $\operatorname{ch}(E) = e^{\lambda_j}$.

== Example: Pontrjagin classes ==
If E is a smooth real vector bundle on a manifold M, then the k-th Pontrjagin class of E is given as:

$$p_k(E) = (-1)^k c_{2k}(E \otimes \Complex) \in H^{4k}(M; \Z)$$

where we wrote $E \otimes \Complex$ for the complexification of E. Equivalently, it is the image under the Chern–Weil homomorphism of the invariant polynomial $g_{2k}$ on $\mathfrak{gl}_n(\R)$ given by:

$$\operatorname{det}\left(I - t {x \over 2 \pi}\right) = \sum_{k = 0}^n g_k(x) t^k.$$

== The homomorphism for holomorphic vector bundles ==
Let E be a holomorphic (complex-)vector bundle on a complex manifold M. The curvature form $\Omega$ of E, with respect to some hermitian metric, is not just a 2-form, but is in fact a (1, 1)-form (see holomorphic vector bundle#Hermitian metrics on a holomorphic vector bundle). Hence, the Chern–Weil homomorphism assumes the form: with $G = \operatorname{GL}_n(\Complex)$,

$$\Complex[\mathfrak{g}]_k \to H^{k, k}(M; \Complex), f \mapsto [f(\Omega)].$$

== See also ==
- ∞-Chern–Weil theory
