= N! conjecture =

In mathematics, the n! conjecture is the conjecture that the dimension of a certain bi-graded module of diagonal harmonics is n!. It was made by A. M. Garsia and M. Haiman and later proved by M. Haiman. It implies Macdonald's positivity conjecture about the Macdonald polynomials.

== Formulation and background ==
The Macdonald polynomials $P_\lambda$ are a two-parameter family of orthogonal polynomials indexed by a positive weight λ of a root system, introduced by Ian G. Macdonald (1987). They generalize several other families of orthogonal polynomials, such as Jack polynomials and Hall–Littlewood polynomials. They are known to have deep relationships with affine Hecke algebras and Hilbert schemes, which were used to prove several conjectures made by Macdonald about them.

Macdonald (1988) introduced a new basis for the space of symmetric functions, which specializes to many of the well-known bases for the symmetric functions, by suitable substitutions for the parameters q and t.

In fact, we can obtain in this manner the Schur functions, the Hall–Littlewood symmetric functions, the Jack symmetric functions, the zonal symmetric functions, the zonal spherical functions, and the elementary and monomial symmetric functions.

The so-called q,t-Kostka polynomials are the coefficients of a resulting transition matrix. Macdonald conjectured that they are polynomials in q and t, with non-negative integer coefficients.

It was Adriano Garsia's idea to construct an appropriate module in order to prove positivity (as was done in his previous joint work with Procesi on Schur positivity of Kostka–Foulkes polynomials).

In an attempt to prove Macdonald's conjecture, Garsia & Haiman (1993) introduced the bi-graded module $H_\mu$ of diagonal harmonics and conjectured that the (modified) Macdonald polynomials are the Frobenius image of the character generating function of H_{μ}, under the diagonal action of the symmetric group.

The proof of Macdonald's conjecture was then reduced to the n! conjecture; i.e., to prove that the dimension of H_{μ} is n!. In 2001, Haiman proved that the dimension is indeed n! (see [4]).

This breakthrough led to the discovery of many hidden connections and new aspects of symmetric group representation theory, as well as combinatorial objects (e.g., insertion tableaux, Haglund's inversion numbers, and the role of parking functions in representation theory).
