= Procesi bundle =

In algebraic geometry, Procesi bundles are vector bundles of rank $n!$ on certain symplectic resolutions of quotient singularities, particularly on the Hilbert scheme of $n$ points in the complex plane. They were used in Mark Haiman's proof of the n! theorem and Macdonald positivity conjecture, and were named after Italian mathematician Claudio Procesi.

== Definition ==
Let $H_n = \text{Hilb}^n(\mathbb{C}^2)$ denote the Hilbert scheme of n points in the complex plane $\mathbb{C}^2$, which provides a resolution of singularities of the quotient $(\mathbb{C}^2)^n/S_n$, where $S_n$ is the symmetric group of degree $n$. A Procesi bundle $\mathcal{P}$ on $H_n$ is a $\mathbb{C}^{\times}$-equivariant vector bundle of rank $n!$ together with an isomorphism $\text{End}(\mathcal{P}) \cong \mathbb{C}[x,y]\#S_n$ (where $\mathbb{C}[x,y]\#S_n$ is the smash product algebra) of $\mathbb{C}[V]^{S_n}$-algebras, such that $\text{Ext}^i(\mathcal{P},\mathcal{P}) = 0$ for all $i > 0$. The isomorphism ensures that each fiber of $\mathcal{P}$ is naturally the regular representation of $S_n$.

More generally, for a finite subgroup $\Gamma \subset \text{SL}_2(\mathbb{C})$ and its wreath product $\Gamma_n = S_n \ltimes \Gamma^n$, Procesi bundles can be defined on symplectic resolutions of $\mathbb{C}^{2n}/\Gamma_n$.

== Properties ==
Procesi bundles provide a derived McKay equivalence between the derived category of coherent sheaves on $H_n$ and the derived category of $S_n$-equivariant modules over $\mathbb{C}[x,y]$. For one distinguished Procesi bundle $\mathcal{P}$, the $\Gamma_{n-1}$-invariants $\mathcal{P}^{S_{n-1}}$ coincide with the tautological bundle on $H_n$. On any symplectic resolution of $\mathbb{C}^{2n}/\Gamma_n$, there are exactly two normalized (meaning $\mathcal{P}^{S_n} \cong \mathcal{O}$) Procesi bundles which are dual to each other.

== History and constructions ==
The first construction of a Procesi bundle was given by American mathematician Mark Haiman in his proof of the n! theorem, using intricate combinatorial methods. Alternative constructions were later developed by Roman Bezrukavnikov and Dmitry Kaledin using quantization in positive characteristic, and by Victor Ginzburg using D-modules and the Hotta-Kashiwara construction.

In 2014, Belarusian-American mathematician Ivan Losev published a complete classification of Procesi bundles on Hamiltonian reductions. In 2019, he showed an inductive construction connecting Procesi bundles with nested Hilbert schemes.

As a result of their use in the proof of the n! theorem, Procesi bundles have also found applications in the proof of the Macdonald positivity conjecture, the study of rational Cherednik algebras and their representations, and understanding derived equivalences for symplectic quotient singularities.

== See also ==
- Geometric invariant theory
