= Koornwinder polynomials =

In mathematics, Macdonald-Koornwinder polynomials (also called Koornwinder polynomials) are a family of orthogonal polynomials in several variables, introduced by Koornwinder and I. G. Macdonald, that generalize the Askey–Wilson polynomials. They are the Macdonald polynomials attached to the non-reduced affine root system of type (C^{∨}_{n}, C_{n}), and in particular satisfy analogues of Macdonald's conjectures. In addition Jan Felipe van Diejen showed that the Macdonald polynomials associated to any classical root system can be expressed as limits or special cases of Macdonald-Koornwinder polynomials and found complete sets of concrete commuting difference operators diagonalized by them. Furthermore, there is a large class of interesting families of multivariable orthogonal polynomials associated with classical root systems which are degenerate cases of the Macdonald-Koornwinder polynomials. The Macdonald-Koornwinder polynomials have also been studied with the aid of affine Hecke algebras.

The Macdonald-Koornwinder polynomial in n variables associated to the partition λ is the unique Laurent polynomial invariant under permutation and inversion of variables, with leading monomial x^{λ}, and orthogonal with respect to the density

$$\prod_{1\le i<j\le n} \frac{(x_i x_j,x_i/x_j,x_j/x_i,1/x_ix_j;q)_\infty}{(t x_ix_j,t x_i/x_j,t x_j/x_i,t/x_ix_j;q)_\infty}
\prod_{1\le i\le n} \frac{(x_i^2,1/x_i^2;q)_\infty}{(a x_i,a/x_i,b x_i,b/x_i,c x_i,c/x_i,d x_i,d/x_i;q)_\infty}$$

on the unit torus

$$|x_1|=|x_2|=\cdots|x_n|=1$$,

where the parameters satisfy the constraints

$$|a|,|b|,|c|,|d|,|q|,|t|<1,$$

and (x;q)_{∞} denotes the infinite q-Pochhammer symbol. Here leading monomial x^{λ} means that μ≤λ for all terms x^{μ} with nonzero coefficient, where μ≤λ if and only if μ_{1}≤λ_{1}, μ_{1}+μ_{2}≤λ_{1}+λ_{2}, …, μ_{1}+…+μ_{n}≤λ_{1}+…+λ_{n}. Under further constraints that q and t are real and that a, b, c, d are real or, if complex, occur in conjugate pairs, the given density is positive.
