= Kostka =

Kostka may refer to:

== People ==
- Kostka family, Polish noble family (szlachta) from Kashubia
- Aleksander Kostka Napierski (1620–1651), Polish captain during the Thirty Years' War in Swedish service
- Anna Kostka (1575–1635), Polish–Lithuanian noble lady
- Carl Kostka (1846–1921), German mathematician, introduced Kostka numbers in 1882
- Dominik Kostka (born 1996), Czech footballer
- Hubert Kostka (born 1940), Polish football player and manager
- Jan Kostka (1529–1581), Polish noble and a candidate in elections for the new King of Poland in 1572
- Katarzyna Kostka (1576–1648), Polish–Lithuanian noble lady
- Michael Kostka (born 1985), ice hockey player
- Petr Kostka (born 1938), Czech actor
- Stan Kostka (1913–1997), American football fullback and later a college football coach
- Stanisław Kostka Gadomski (1718–1797), Polish nobleman and politician
- Stanisław Kostka Potocki (1755–1821), Polish noble, politician, writer, publicist, collector and patron of art
- Stanisław Kostka Zamoyski (1775–1856), Polish nobleman, politician, landowner and patron of arts
- Stanislaus Kostka S.J. (1550–1568), Polish novice of the Jesuits
- Stefan Kostka (born 1939), American music theorist
- Tomáš Kostka (born 1984), Czech racing driver living in France
- Vladimír Kostka (1922–2009), Czech ice hockey coach

== Places ==
- Mount Kostka, Antarctica

== In mathematics ==
- Kostka number K_{λμ}, introduced by Carl Kostka in 1882, non-negative integer depending on two partitions λ and μ, that is equal to the number of semistandard Young tableaux of shape λ and weight μ
- Kostka polynomial or Kostka–Foulkes polynomial K_{λμ}(q, t), named after Carl Kostka, polynomial in two variables with non-negative integer coefficients depending on two partitions λ and μ

== See also ==
- Kostka-Napierski uprising, peasant revolt in Poland in 1651
- Saint-Stanislas-de-Kostka, Quebec, municipality of Quebec, Canada
- St. Stanislaus Kostka Church (disambiguation)
