= Knizhnik =

Knizhnik or Knijnik (Cyrillic script: Книжник) is a Ukrainian and Russian occupational surname, meaning "librarian" (or "scribe").

It may refer to the following individuals:

- Vadim Knizhnik — a Soviet physicist of Jewish and Russian descent.
- Shana Knizhnik — an American lawyer and author from Philadelphia.

== See also ==
- Knizhnik–Zamolodchikov equations
