= Kostek (name) =

Kostek is a Polish diminutive of the name Konstanty (disambiguation). It can also be a surname. Notable people and fictional characters with the name include:

== Given name ==
- Kostek Joriadis (born 1963), Polish musician
- Kostek aka K. Crooks, co-founder of Cereal Killaz

== Surname ==
- Arkadiusz Kostek, Polish hockey player
- Bożena Kostek, Polish computer scientist and audio engineer
- Brian “Wookie” Kostek, WDSY-FM host
- Camille Kostek (born 1992), American model, television host, and actress
- Mark Kostek, Drake Relays director and 1997 Pittsburgh Panthers football team assistant strength and conditioning coach
- Wacław Kostek-Biernacki (1882–1957), Polish politician and writer

== Fictional characters ==
- Kostek, a character in the 1955 film A Generation played by Zbigniew Cybulski

== See also ==
- Kostka
