= Cherednik =

Cherednik or Cherednyk (Чередник) is a Ukrainian surname. Notable people with the surname include:

- Ivan Cherednik Mathematician
  - Cherednik algebra
- Oleksiy Cherednyk Football player
- Yuri Cherednik, Volleyball player
