= Quintuple product identity =

Infinite product identity introduced by Watson

In mathematics the Watson quintuple product identity is an infinite product identity introduced by Watson (1929) and rediscovered by Bailey (1951) and Gordon (1961). It is analogous to the Jacobi triple product identity, and is the Macdonald identity for a certain non-reduced affine root system. It is related to Euler's pentagonal number theorem.

== Statement ==
$$\prod_{n\ge 1} (1-s^n)(1-s^nt)(1-s^{n-1}t^{-1})(1-s^{2n-1}t^2)(1-s^{2n-1}t^{-2})
= \sum_{n\in \mathbf{Z}}s^{(3n^2+n)/2}(t^{3n}-t^{-3n-1})$$

== See also ==
- Hirschhorn–Farkas–Kra septagonal numbers identity
