= Affine algebra =

Affine algebra may refer to:

- Affine Lie algebra, a type of Kac–Moody algebras
- The Lie algebra of the affine group
- Reduced finitely-generated algebra over a field
- Affine Hecke algebra
