= Affine braid group =

In mathematics, an affine braid group is a braid group associated to an affine Coxeter system. Their group rings have quotients called affine Hecke algebras. They are subgroups of double affine braid groups.
