= Double affine braid group =

In mathematics, a double affine braid group is a group containing the braid group of an affine Weyl group. Their group rings have quotients called double affine Hecke algebras in the same way that the group rings of affine braid groups have quotients that are affine Hecke algebras.

For affine A_{n} groups, the double affine braid group is the fundamental group of the space of n distinct points on a 2-dimensional torus.
