= Hodge algebra =

In mathematics, a Hodge algebra or algebra with straightening law is a commutative algebra that is a free module over some ring R, together with a given basis similar to the basis of standard monomials of the coordinate ring of a Grassmannian. Hodge algebras were introduced by Corrado De Concini, David Eisenbud, and Claudio Procesi (1982), who named them after W. V. D. Hodge.
