= Homogeneous variety =

In algebraic geometry, a homogeneous variety is an algebraic variety on which an algebraic group acts transitively. Homogeneous varieties over an algebraically closed field are quotient varieties G/H where G is an algebraic group and H a subgroup scheme (for instance, an algebraic subgroup).

Such varieties are always smooth quasi-projective varieties.

Classical examples are flag varieties (when G is semisimple and H a parabolic subgroup), or more generally homogeneous spherical varieties. Severi-Brauer varieties are examples of homogeneous varieties over a field without any rational points.

== See also ==
- Homogeneous space
- Symmetric space
- Symmetric variety
