= LLT polynomial =

Mathematical term

In mathematics, an LLT polynomial is one of a family of symmetric functions introduced as q-analogues of products of Schur functions.

J. Haglund, M. Haiman, and N. Loehr showed how to expand Macdonald polynomials in terms of LLT polynomials. Ian Grojnowski and Mark Haiman proved a positivity conjecture for LLT polynomials that combined with the previous result implies the Macdonald positivity conjecture for Macdonald polynomials, and extended the definition of LLT polynomials to arbitrary finite root systems.

== Bibliography ==
- I. Grojnowski, M. Haiman, Affine algebras and positivity (preprint available here)
- J. Haglund, M. Haiman, N. Loehr A Combinatorial Formula for Macdonald PolynomialsMR 2138143 J. Amer. Math. Soc. 18 (2005), no. 3, 735–761
- Alain Lascoux, Bernard Leclerc, and Jean-Yves Thibon Ribbon Tableaux, Hall-Littlewood Functions, Quantum Affine Algebras and Unipotent Varieties MR 1434225 J. Math. Phys. 38 (1997), no. 2, 1041–1068.
