= Symmetric variety =

Mathematical concept

In algebraic geometry, a symmetric variety is an algebraic analogue of a symmetric space in differential geometry, given by a quotient G/H of a reductive algebraic group G by the subgroup H fixed by some involution of G.

== See also ==
- Wonderful compactification
- Homogeneous variety
- Spherical variety
