= Askey–Wilson polynomials =

In mathematics, the Askey–Wilson polynomials (or q-Wilson polynomials) are a family of orthogonal polynomials introduced by Richard Askey and James A. Wilson as q-analogs of the Wilson polynomials. They include many of the other orthogonal polynomials in 1 variable as special or limiting cases, described in the Askey scheme. Askey–Wilson polynomials are the special case of Macdonald polynomials (or Koornwinder polynomials) for the non-reduced affine root system of type (C^{∨}_{1}, C_{1}), and their 4 parameters a, b, c, d correspond to the 4 orbits of roots of this root system.

They are defined by

$$p_n(x) =
p_n(x;a,b,c,d\mid q) :=
a^{-n}(ab,ac,ad;q)_n\;_{4}\phi_3 \left[\begin{matrix}
q^{-n}&abcdq^{n-1}&ae^{i\theta}&ae^{-i\theta} \\
ab&ac&ad \end{matrix}
; q,q \right]$$

where φ is a basic hypergeometric function, x = cos θ, and (,,,)_{n} is the q-Pochhammer symbol. Askey–Wilson functions are a generalization to non-integral values of n.

== Proof ==
This result can be proven since it is known that

$$p_n(\cos{\theta}) = p_n(\cos{\theta};a,b,c,d\mid q)$$

and using the definition of the q-Pochhammer symbol

$$p_n(\cos{\theta})=
a^{-n}\sum_{\ell=0}^{n}q^{\ell}\left(abq^{\ell},acq^{\ell},adq^{\ell};q\right)_{n-\ell}\times\frac{\left(q^{-n},abcdq^{n-1};q\right)_{\ell}}{(q;q)_{\ell}}\prod_{j=0}^{\ell-1}\left(1-2aq^j\cos{\theta}+a^2q^{2j}\right)$$

which leads to the conclusion that it equals

$$a^{-n}(ab,ac,ad;q)_n\;_{4}\phi_3 \left[\begin{matrix}
q^{-n}&abcdq^{n-1}&ae^{i\theta}&ae^{-i\theta} \\
ab&ac&ad \end{matrix}
; q,q \right]$$

== See also ==
- Askey scheme
