= Sylvie Corteel =

French mathematician

Sylvie Corteel is a French mathematician at the Centre national de la recherche scientifique and Paris Diderot University and the University of California, Berkeley, who was an editor-in-chief of the Journal of Combinatorial Theory, Series A. Her research concerns the enumerative combinatorics and algebraic combinatorics of permutations, Young tableaux, and integer partitions.

== Education and career ==
After earning an engineering degree in 1996 from the University of Technology of Compiègne, Corteel worked with Carla Savage at North Carolina State University, where she earned a master's degree in 1997. She completed her Ph.D. in 2000 at the University of Paris-Sud under the supervision of Dominique Gouyou-Beauchamps, and earned a habilitation in 2010 at Paris Diderot University.

She worked as a maitresse de conférences and then as a CNRS chargée de recherche at the Versailles Saint-Quentin-en-Yvelines University from 2000 to 2005, also doing postdoctoral studies at the Université du Québec à Montréal in 2001. From 2005 to 2009 she was associated with the University of Paris-Sud, and in 2009 she moved to Paris Diderot, where in 2010 she became a director of research. Since 2017 she has been a Visiting Miller Professor at the University of California, Berkeley. She was named MSRI Simons Professor for 2017-2018.

Along with colleagues O. Mandelshtam and L. Williams, in 2018 Corteel developed a new characterization of both symmetric and nonsymmetric Macdonald polynomials using the combinatorial exclusion process.

== Selected publications ==
- Bergeron, Anne; Corteel, Sylvie; Raffinot, Mathieu (2002), "The algorithmic of gene teams", in Guigó, Roderic; Gusfield, Dan (eds.), Algorithms in Bioinformatics: Second International Workshop, WABI 2002, Rome, Italy, September 17–21, 2002, Proceedings, Lecture Notes in Computer Science, vol. 2452, Berlin: Springer, pp. 464–476, doi:10.1007/3-540-45784-4_36, ISBN 978-3-540-44211-0
- Corteel, Sylvie; Lovejoy, Jeremy (2004), "Overpartitions", Transactions of the American Mathematical Society, 356 (4): 1623–1635, doi:10.1090/S0002-9947-03-03328-2, MR 2034322
- Corteel, Sylvie (2007), "Crossings and alignments of permutations", Advances in Applied Mathematics, 38 (2): 149–163, arXiv:math/0601469, doi:10.1016/j.aam.2006.01.006, MR 2290808, S2CID 10061267
- Corteel, Sylvie; Mandelshtam, Olya; Williams, Lauren (2022), "From multiline queues to Macdonald polynomials via the exclusion process", American Journal of Mathematics, 144 (2): 395–436, arXiv:1811.01024, doi:10.1353/ajm.2022.0007, MR 4401508
- Corteel, Sylvie; Williams, Lauren K. (2007), "Tableaux combinatorics for the asymmetric exclusion process", Advances in Applied Mathematics, 39 (3): 293–310, arXiv:math/0602109, doi:10.1016/j.aam.2006.08.002, MR 2352041, S2CID 18546635
