= Adrian Ioana =

Romanian mathematician

- Born: 18 January 1981 (age 45); Târgu Jiu, Romania
- Education: University of California, Los Angeles; University of Bucharest
- Awards: EMS Prize (2012)
- Scientific career
- Fields: Mathematics
- Workplaces: University of California, San Diego
- Thesis: Some rigidity results in the orbit equivalence theory of non-amenable groups (2007)
- Doctoral advisor: Sorin Popa

Adrian Ioana (born 18 January 1981, Târgu Jiu) is a Romanian mathematician. He is currently a professor at the University of California, San Diego.

Ioana earned a BS in Mathematics from the University of Bucharest in 2003, and completed his PhD at the University of California, Los Angeles in 2007, under the supervision of Sorin Popa. He then was a postdoc at the California Institute of Technology and a Research Fellow supported by the Clay Mathematics Institute, after which he joined UC San Diego in 2011.

For his contributions to von Neumann algebras and representation theory of groups, he was awarded a 2012 EMS Prize. In 2018 he was an invited speaker at the International Congress of Mathematicians (ICM) in Rio de Janeiro (on "Rigidity for von Neumann algebras"). He was named as a Fellow of the American Mathematical Society, in its 2027 class of fellows.
