= Introduction to Commutative Algebra =

1969 mathematics textbook

- First edition
- Authors: M. F. Atiyah; I. G. MacDonald
- Language: English
- Subject: Algebra
- Genre: Textbook
- Published: 1969
- Publisher: Addison-Wesley
- Pages: 128
- ISBN: 0-201-00361-9

Introduction to Commutative Algebra (often informally referred to by the authors' names as "Atiyah and Macdonald") is a well-known commutative algebra textbook written by Michael Atiyah and Ian G. Macdonald. It is on the list of 173 books essential for undergraduate math libraries. As of May 2025, Google Scholar lists over 8000 citations to this book. It has been translated into Russian, Chinese, Japanese, and Spanish.

It deals with elementary concepts of commutative algebra including localization, primary decomposition, integral dependence, Noetherian and Artinian rings and modules, Dedekind rings, completions and a moderate amount of dimension theory. Having originated as a set of lecture notes for third-year undergraduate students at Oxford University, it is notable for being among the shorter English-language introductory textbooks in the subject, employing a terse style while also relegating a good deal of material (including a brief introduction to prime spectra and scheme theory) to the exercises.

== Reviews ==
Michael Berg says "this classic book, is one of the premier texts for a serious graduate (or very gifted undergraduate) student". Mark Green calls it an "elegant minimalist introduction". W. Jonsson says "An amazing amount of information is included in the 128 pages of this book". D. J. Lewis says "The highlight of the text is the very excellent set of problems which constitute one-third of the text". B. R. McDonald says "The student consensus was that the text was very readable ... we were pleased with the success of the text". On the other hand, Lewis says "The text is very tersely written, examples are a bit scarce and proofs are condensed. This reviewer doubts that many students can profitably read it unassisted."

The book has enthusiastic endorsements from several math professors. Henry Pinkham, former Professor of Math at Columbia University said "probably the best introduction to Commutative Algebra, and has very good exercises." Jonathan Wise, Associate Professor at University of Colorado Boulder says "may be the best math textbook ever written."
