= G. N. Watson =

English mathematician (1886–1965)

G. N. Watson FRS FRSE
- Born: George Neville Watson; 31 January 1886; Westward Ho!, England
- Died: 2 February 1965 (aged 79); Leamington Spa, Warwickshire, England
- Education: Trinity College, Cambridge
- Known for: Whittaker and Watson text Watson's quintuple product identity
- Awards: Smith's Prize (1909); Sylvester Medal (1946); De Morgan Medal (1947); Fellow of the Royal Society
- Scientific career
- Fields: Mathematics
- Workplaces: University of Birmingham; University of Cambridge
- Doctoral advisor: E. T. Whittaker

George Neville Watson FRS FRSE (31 January 1886 – 2 February 1965) was an English mathematician, who applied complex analysis to the theory of special functions. His collaboration on the 1915 second edition of E. T. Whittaker's A Course of Modern Analysis (1902) produced the classic "Whittaker and Watson" text. In 1918 he proved a significant result known as Watson's lemma, that has many applications in the theory on the asymptotic behaviour of exponential integrals.

== Life ==
He was born in Westward Ho! in Devon the son of George Wentworth Watson, a schoolmaster and genealogist, and his wife, Mary Justina Griffith.

He was educated at St Paul's School in London, as a pupil of F. S. Macaulay. He then studied Mathematics at Trinity College, Cambridge. There he encountered E. T. Whittaker, though their overlap was only two years.

From 1914 to 1918 he lectured in Mathematics at University College, London. He became Professor of Pure Mathematics at the University of Birmingham in 1918, replacing Prof R S Heath, and remained in this role until 1951.

He was awarded an honorary MSc Pure Science in 1919 by Birmingham University.

He was President of the London Mathematical Society 1933/35.

He died at Leamington Spa on 2 February 1965.

== Works ==
Watson published two papers, in 1918 and 1919, on long-distance wave propagation, "The diffraction of electric waves", and "The transmission of electric waves". According to Yeang, "The theory of atmospheric reflection now gained major empirical support from long-distance propagation experiments. Since then, radio scientists and engineers have held that wave reflection between the earth and the upper layer is responsible for long-distance radio transmission, and Watson's transformation has been a useful mathematical tool for analyzing propagation of electromagnetic waves."

His Treatise on the theory of Bessel functions (1922) also became a classic, in particular in regard to the asymptotic expansions of Bessel functions.

He subsequently spent many years on Ramanujan's formulae in the area of modular equations, mock theta functions and q-series, and for some time looked after Ramanujan's lost notebook.

Sometime in the late 1920s, G. N. Watson and B. M. Wilson began the task of editing Ramanujan's notebooks. The second notebook, being a revised, enlarged edition of the first, was their primary focus. Wilson was assigned Chapters 2–14, and Watson was to examine Chapters 15–21. Wilson devoted his efforts to this task until 1935, when he died from an infection at the early age of 38. Watson wrote over 30 papers inspired by the notebooks before his interest evidently waned in the late 1930s.

Ramanujan discovered many more modular equations than all of his mathematical predecessors combined. Watson provided proofs for most of Ramanujan's modular equations. Bruce C. Berndt completed the project begun by Watson and Wilson. Much of Berndt's book Ramanujan's Notebooks, Part 3 (1998) is based upon the prior work of Watson.

Watson's interests included solvable cases of the quintic equation. He introduced Watson's quintuple product identity.

== Honours and awards ==
In 1919 Watson was elected a Fellow of the Royal Society, and in 1946, he received the Sylvester Medal from the Society. He was president of the London Mathematical Society from 1933 to 1935.

He is sometimes confused with the mathematician G. L. Watson, who worked on quadratic forms, and G. Watson, a statistician.

== Family ==
In 1925 he married Elfrida Gwenfil Lane daughter of Thomas Wright Lane.
