= Sorin Popa =

Romanian-American mathematician

Sorin Teodor Popa
- Born: March 24, 1953 (age 73); Bucharest, Romanian People's Republic
- Education: University of Bucharest
- Known for: Von Neumann algebras, subfactors, ergodic theory
- Awards: Guggenheim Fellow (1995); Ostrowski Prize (2009); Moore Prize (2010)
- Scientific career
- Fields: Mathematics
- Institutions: University of California, Los Angeles
- Thesis: Studiul unor clase de subalgebre ale $C^*$-algebrelor (1983)
- Doctoral advisor: Dan-Virgil Voiculescu
- Doctoral students: Adrian Ioana
- Website: www.math.ucla.edu/~popa

Sorin Teodor Popa (born March 24, 1953) is a Romanian American mathematician working on Von Neumann algebras, C*-algebras, and ergodic theory. More recently he developed deformation-rigidity theory in von Neumann algebras. He is a distinguished professor at the University of California, Los Angeles, where he holds the Takesaki Chair in Operator Algebras. He was elected a Member of the National Academy of Sciences in 2025.

== Biography ==
Popa earned his PhD from the University of Bucharest in 1983 under the supervision of Dan-Virgil Voiculescu, with thesis Studiul unor clase de subalgebre ale $C^*$-algebrelor. He has advised 15 doctoral students at UCLA, including Adrian Ioana.

== Honors and awards ==
In 1990, Popa was an invited speaker at the International Congress of Mathematicians (ICM) in Kyoto, where he gave a talk on "Subfactors and Classifications in von Neumann algebras". He was a Guggenheim Fellow in 1995. In 2006, he gave a plenary lecture at the ICM in Madrid on "Deformation and Rigidity for group actions and Von Neumann Algebras". In 2009, he was awarded the Ostrowski Prize, and in 2010 the E. H. Moore Prize. He is one of the inaugural fellows of the American Mathematical Society. In 2013, he was elected to the American Academy of Arts and Sciences. In the Spring of 2025 he was elected to the National Academy of Sciences.

== Selected publications ==
- Pimsner, Mihai; Popa, Sorin (1986). "Entropy and index for subfactors". Annales Scientifiques de l'École Normale Supérieure. 19 (1): 57–106. doi:10.24033/asens.1504. MR 0860811.
- Popa, Sorin (1994). "Classification of amenable subfactors of type II". Acta Mathematica. 172 (2): 163–255. doi:10.1007/BF02392646. MR 1278111. S2CID 123256227.
- Popa, Sorin (1995). Classification of subfactors and their endomorphisms. CBMS Regional Conference Series in Mathematics. Vol. 86. Providence, Rhode Island: American Mathematical Society. doi:10.1090/cbms/086. ISBN 978-0-8218-0321-9. MR 1339767.
- Popa, Sorin (2006). "On a class of type II 1 factors with Betti numbers invariants". Annals of Mathematics. 163 (3): 809–899. arXiv:math/0209130. doi:10.4007/annals.2006.163.809. MR 2215135. S2CID 119174749.
- Popa, Sorin (2008). "On the superrigidity of malleable actions with spectral gap". Journal of the American Mathematical Society. 21 (4): 981–1000. arXiv:math/0608429. Bibcode:2008JAMS...21..981P. doi:10.1090/S0894-0347-07-00578-4. MR 2425177. S2CID 1298719.
