= Macdonald identities =

Infinite product identities associated to affine root systems

In mathematics, the Macdonald identities are some infinite product identities associated to affine root systems, introduced by Ian Macdonald (1972). They include as special cases the Jacobi triple product identity, Watson's quintuple product identity, several identities found by Dyson (1972), and a 10-fold product identity found by Winquist (1969).

Kac (1974) and Moody (1975) pointed out that the Macdonald identities are the analogs of the Weyl denominator formula for affine Kac–Moody algebras and superalgebras.
