= Lauren Williams (mathematician) =

American mathematician

Lauren K. Williams
- Lauren Williams
- Born: c. 1978 (age 47–48)
- Education: Harvard University (B.A., 2000); Massachusetts Institute of Technology (Ph.D., 2005)
- Scientific career
- Fields: Mathematics
- Workplaces: Harvard University
- Thesis: Combinatorial aspects of total positivity (2005)
- Doctoral advisor: Richard P. Stanley

Lauren Kiyomi Williams (born c. 1978) is an American mathematician known for her work on cluster algebras, tropical geometry, algebraic combinatorics, amplituhedra, and the positive Grassmannian. She is Dwight Parker Robinson professor of mathematics at Harvard University. She was awarded a MacArthur Fellowship in 2025.

== Education ==
Williams's father is an engineer; her mother is third-generation Japanese American. She grew up in Los Angeles, where she was born. Her interest in mathematics was sparked by winning a fourth-grade mathematics contest. She graduated as valedictorian of Palos Verdes Peninsula High School in 1996. As a high school student, Williams attended the 1994 Research Science Institute at MIT, where she conducted research with Satomi Okazaki, a student of her eventual Ph.D. advisor Richard P. Stanley. She graduated magna cum laude from Harvard University in 2000 with an A.B. in mathematics and in 2001 completed Part III of the Mathematical Tripos with distinction at Cambridge University in England. In 2005 she received her Ph.D. from MIT under the supervision of Stanley. Her dissertation was titled Combinatorial aspects of total positivity.

== Work ==
After postdoctoral positions at the University of California, Berkeley and Harvard, Williams rejoined the Berkeley mathematics department as an assistant professor in 2009, and was promoted to associate professor in 2013 and then full professor in 2016.

Starting in the fall of 2018, she rejoined the Harvard mathematics department as a full professor, making her the second ever tenured female math professor at Harvard. The first, Sophie Morel, left Harvard in 2012.

Along with colleagues Olya Mandelshtam (her former student, now an assistant professor at the University of Waterloo) and Sylvie Corteel, in 2018 Williams developed a new characterization of both symmetric and nonsymmetric Macdonald polynomials using the combinatorial exclusion process.

== Awards ==
In 2012, she became one of the inaugural fellows of the American Mathematical Society. She is the 2016 winner of the Association for Women in Mathematics and Microsoft Research Prize in Algebra and Number Theory. In 2022 she was awarded a Guggenheim Fellowship. In 2025 she was awarded a MacArthur Fellowship.

== Selected publications ==
- Williams, Lauren K. (2005), "Enumeration of totally positive Grassmann cells", Advances in Mathematics, 190 (2): 319–342, arXiv:math/0307271, doi:10.1016/j.aim.2004.01.003, MR 2102660, S2CID 15538736
- Postnikov, Alex; Reiner, Victor; Williams, Lauren (2008), "Faces of generalized permutohedra", Documenta Mathematica, 13: 207–273, arXiv:math/0609184, Bibcode:2006math......9184P, doi:10.4171/dm/248, MR 2520477, S2CID 10679764
- Musiker, Gregg; Schiffler, Ralf; Williams, Lauren (2011), "Positivity for cluster algebras from surfaces", Advances in Mathematics, 227 (6): 2241–2308, arXiv:0906.0748, doi:10.1016/j.aim.2011.04.018, MR 2807089, S2CID 13559804
- Kodama, Yuji; Williams, Lauren K. (2011), "KP solitons, total positivity, and cluster algebras", Proceedings of the National Academy of Sciences of the United States of America, 108 (22): 8984–8989, arXiv:1105.4170, Bibcode:2011PNAS..108.8984K, doi:10.1073/pnas.1102627108, MR 2813307, PMC 3107278, PMID 21562211
- Kodama, Yuji; Williams, Lauren K. (2014), "KP solitons and total positivity of the Grassmannian", Inventiones Mathematicae, 198 (3): 637–699, arXiv:1106.0023, Bibcode:2014InMat.198..637K, doi:10.1007/s00222-014-0506-3, MR 3279534, S2CID 51759294
- Ardila, Federico; Rincón, Felipe; Williams, Lauren (2016), "Positroids and non-crossing partitions", Transactions of the American Mathematical Society, 368 (1): 337–363, arXiv:1308.2698, doi:10.1090/tran/6331, MR 3413866, S2CID 17008394
- Corteel, Sylvie; Mandelshtam, Olya; Williams, Lauren (2022), "From multiline queues to Macdonald polynomials via the exclusion process", American Journal of Mathematics, 144 (2): 395–436, arXiv:1811.01024, doi:10.1353/ajm.2022.0007, MR 4401508
