= Hessenberg variety =

In geometry, Hessenberg varieties, first studied by Filippo De Mari, Claudio Procesi, and Mark A. Shayman, are subvarieties of the full flag variety that are defined in terms of a Hessenberg function h and a linear transformation X. The study of Hessenberg varieties was first motivated by questions in numerical analysis in relation to algorithms for computing eigenvalues and eigenspaces of the linear operator X. Later work by T. A. Springer, Dale Peterson, Bertram Kostant, among others, found connections with combinatorics, representation theory and cohomology.

== Definitions ==
A Hessenberg function is a map

$$h :\{1,2, \ldots,n \} \rightarrow \{1,2, \ldots,n \}$$

such that

$$h(i+1) \geq \text{max }(i,h(i))$$

for each i. For example, the function that sends the numbers 1 to 5 (in order) to 2, 3, 3, 4, and 5 is a Hessenberg function.

For any Hessenberg function h and a linear transformation

$$X: \Complex^n \rightarrow \Complex^n, \,$$

the Hessenberg variety $\mathcal{H}(X,h)$ is the set of all flags $F_{\bullet}$ such that

$$X \cdot F_i \subseteq F_{h(i)}$$

for all i.

== Examples ==
Examples of Hessenberg varieties (with their $h$ functions) include:

The full flag variety: h(i) = n for all i.

The Peterson variety: $h(i) = i+1$ for $i = 1,2,\dots, n-1.$

The Springer variety: $h(i) = i$ for all $i.$
