= Ranjan Roy =

American mathematician

Ranjan Roy (1948 – 2020) was an Indian-born American mathematician. He spent most of his career as a professor at Beloit College.

== Education ==
Roy received a BS degree from the Indian Institute of Technology Kharagpur, an MS in mathematics from the Indian Institute of Technology Kanpur, and a PhD at Stony Brook University.

== Career ==
After receiving his PhD, Roy taught at the University of Kentucky for a short time, then returned to India where he took posts at the Indian Institute of Technology Delhi and Himachal Pradesh University, and received a fellowship at the Indian Institute of Advanced Study. After spending two years at the institute, he joined the Mathematics Institute at Punjab University as a Reader. He returned to the U.S. at SUNY Plattsburgh.

In 1982, Roy joined Beloit College, spending the rest of his career there. He became the Ralph C. Huffer Professor of Mathematics and Astronomy, and at the time of his death, he was the chair of the Mathematics and Computer Science Department.

== Publications ==
Roy published many papers on differential equations, fluid mechanics, special functions, Fuchsian groups, and the history of mathematics. He authored three advanced mathematics books: Sources in the Development of Mathematics (2011), Elliptic and Modular Functions from Gauss to Dedekind to Hecke (2017) and the posthumously published Series and Products in the Development of Mathematics (2021) all published by Cambridge University Press. He is a coauthor of the book Special Functions (with G. E. Andrews and R. Askey), published by Cambridge University Press in 1999.

== Awards ==
Roy earned several recognitions for distinguished mathematics teaching, including the following:

- In 2003, Roy was one of three professors to receive the Deborah and Franklin Haimo Award for Distinguished College or University Teaching of Mathematics.
- The MAA Carl B. Allendoerfer Award
- The MAA Wisconsin Section teaching award
- Teacher of the Year honors from Beloit College in 1986 & 2000.
