= Jack function =

Generalization of the Jack polynomial

In mathematics, the Jack function is a generalization of the Jack polynomial, introduced by Henry Jack. The Jack polynomial is a homogeneous, symmetric polynomial which generalizes the Schur and zonal polynomials, and is in turn generalized by the Heckman–Opdam polynomials and Macdonald polynomials.

== Definition ==
The Jack function $J_\kappa^{(\alpha )}(x_1,x_2,\ldots,x_m)$ of an integer partition $\kappa$, parameter $\alpha$, and arguments $x_1,x_2,\ldots,x_m$ can be recursively defined as follows:

For m=1

$$J_{k}^{(\alpha )}(x_1)=x_1^k(1+\alpha)\cdots (1+(k-1)\alpha)$$

For m>1

$$J_\kappa^{(\alpha )}(x_1,x_2,\ldots,x_m)=\sum_\mu
J_\mu^{(\alpha )}(x_1,x_2,\ldots,x_{m-1})
x_m^{|\kappa /\mu|}\beta_{\kappa \mu},$$

where the summation is over all partitions $\mu$ such that the skew partition $\kappa/\mu$ is a horizontal strip, namely

$\kappa_1\ge\mu_1\ge\kappa_2\ge\mu_2\ge\cdots\ge\kappa_{n-1}\ge\mu_{n-1}\ge\kappa_n$ ($\mu_n$ must be zero or otherwise $J_\mu(x_1,\ldots,x_{n-1})=0$) and
$$\beta_{\kappa\mu}=\frac{
\prod_{(i,j)\in \kappa} B_{\kappa\mu}^\kappa(i,j)
}{
\prod_{(i,j)\in \mu} B_{\kappa\mu}^\mu(i,j)
},$$

where $B_{\kappa\mu}^\nu(i,j)$ equals $\kappa_j'-i+\alpha(\kappa_i-j+1)$ if $\kappa_j'=\mu_j'$ and $\kappa_j'-i+1+\alpha(\kappa_i-j)$ otherwise. The expressions $\kappa'$ and $\mu'$ refer to the conjugate partitions of $\kappa$ and $\mu$, respectively. The notation $(i,j)\in\kappa$ means that the product is taken over all coordinates $(i,j)$ of boxes in the Young diagram of the partition $\kappa$.

=== Combinatorial formula ===
In 1997, F. Knop and S. Sahi gave a purely combinatorial formula for the Jack polynomials $J_\mu^{(\alpha )}$ in n variables:

$$J_\mu^{(\alpha )} = \sum_{T} d_T(\alpha) \prod_{s \in T} x_{T(s)}.$$

The sum is taken over all admissible tableaux of shape $\lambda,$ and

$$d_T(\alpha) = \prod_{s \in T \text{ critical}} d_\lambda(\alpha)(s)$$

with

$$d_\lambda(\alpha)(s) = \alpha(a_\lambda(s) +1) + (l_\lambda(s) + 1).$$

An admissible tableau of shape $\lambda$ is a filling of the Young diagram $\lambda$ with numbers 1,2,...,n such that for any box (i,j) in the tableau,

- $T(i,j) \neq T(i',j)$ whenever $i'>i.$
- $T(i,j) \neq T(i,j-1)$ whenever $j>1$ and $i'<i.$

A box $s = (i,j) \in \lambda$ is critical for the tableau T if $j > 1$ and $T(i,j)=T(i,j-1).$

This result can be seen as a special case of the more general combinatorial formula for Macdonald polynomials.

== C normalization ==
The Jack functions form an orthogonal basis in a space of symmetric polynomials, with inner product:

$$\langle f,g\rangle = \int_{[0,2\pi]^n} f \left (e^{i\theta_1},\ldots,e^{i\theta_n} \right ) \overline{g \left (e^{i\theta_1},\ldots,e^{i\theta_n} \right )} \prod_{1\le j<k\le n} \left |e^{i\theta_j}-e^{i\theta_k} \right |^{\frac{2}{\alpha}} d\theta_1\cdots d\theta_n$$

This orthogonality property is unaffected by normalization. The normalization defined above is typically referred to as the J normalization. The C normalization is defined as

$$C_\kappa^{(\alpha)}(x_1,\ldots,x_n) = \frac{\alpha^{|\kappa|}(|\kappa|)!}{j_\kappa} J_\kappa^{(\alpha)}(x_1,\ldots,x_n),$$

where

$$j_\kappa=\prod_{(i,j)\in \kappa} \left (\kappa_j'-i+\alpha \left (\kappa_i-j+1 \right ) \right ) \left (\kappa_j'-i+1+\alpha \left (\kappa_i-j \right ) \right ).$$

For $\alpha=2, C_\kappa^{(2)}(x_1,\ldots,x_n)$ is often denoted by $C_\kappa(x_1,\ldots,x_n)$ and called the Zonal polynomial.

== P normalization ==
The P normalization is given by the identity $J_\lambda = H'_\lambda P_\lambda$, where

$$H'_\lambda = \prod_{s\in \lambda} (\alpha a_\lambda(s) + l_\lambda(s) + 1)$$

where $a_\lambda$ and $l_\lambda$ denotes the arm and leg length respectively. Therefore, for $\alpha=1, P_\lambda$ is the usual Schur function.

Similar to Schur polynomials, $P_\lambda$ can be expressed as a sum over Young tableaux. However, one need to add an extra weight to each tableau that depends on the parameter $\alpha$.

Thus, a formula for the Jack function $P_\lambda$ is given by

$$P_\lambda = \sum_{T} \psi_T(\alpha) \prod_{s \in \lambda}  x_{T(s)}$$

where the sum is taken over all tableaux of shape $\lambda$, and $T(s)$ denotes the entry in box s of T.

The weight $\psi_T(\alpha)$ can be defined in the following fashion: Each tableau T of shape $\lambda$ can be interpreted as a sequence of partitions

$$\emptyset = \nu_1 \to \nu_2 \to \dots \to \nu_n = \lambda$$

where $\nu_{i+1}/\nu_i$ defines the skew shape with content i in T. Then

$$\psi_T(\alpha) = \prod_i \psi_{\nu_{i+1}/\nu_i}(\alpha)$$

where

$$\psi_{\lambda/\mu}(\alpha) = \prod_{s \in R_{\lambda/\mu}-C_{\lambda/\mu} } \frac{(\alpha a_\mu(s) + l_\mu(s) +1)}{(\alpha a_\mu(s) + l_\mu(s) + \alpha)} \frac{(\alpha a_\lambda(s) + l_\lambda(s) + \alpha)}{(\alpha a_\lambda(s) + l_\lambda(s) +1)}$$

and the product is taken only over all boxes s in $\lambda$ such that s has a box from $\lambda/\mu$ in the same row, but not in the same column.

== Connection with the Schur polynomial ==
When $\alpha=1$ the Jack function is a scalar multiple of the Schur polynomial

$$J^{(1)}_\kappa(x_1,x_2,\ldots,x_n) = H_\kappa s_\kappa(x_1,x_2,\ldots,x_n),$$

where

$$H_\kappa=\prod_{(i,j)\in\kappa} h_\kappa(i,j)=
\prod_{(i,j)\in\kappa} (\kappa_i+\kappa_j'-i-j+1)$$

is the product of all hook lengths of $\kappa$.

== Properties ==
If the partition has more parts than the number of variables, then the Jack function is 0:

$$J_\kappa^{(\alpha )}(x_1,x_2,\ldots,x_m)=0, \mbox{ if }\kappa_{m+1}>0.$$

== Matrix argument ==
In some texts, especially in random matrix theory, authors have found it more convenient to use a matrix argument in the Jack function. The connection is simple. If $X$ is a matrix with eigenvalues $x_1,x_2,\ldots,x_m$, then

$$J_\kappa^{(\alpha )}(X)=J_\kappa^{(\alpha )}(x_1,x_2,\ldots,x_m).$$

== Bibliography ==
- Demmel, James; Koev, Plamen (2006), "Accurate and efficient evaluation of Schur and Jack functions", Mathematics of Computation, 75 (253): 223–239, doi:10.1090/S0025-5718-05-01780-1, MR 2176397.
- Jack, Henry (1970–1971), "A class of symmetric polynomials with a parameter", Proceedings of the Royal Society of Edinburgh, Section A. Mathematics, 69: 1–18, MR 0289462.
- Knop, Friedrich; Sahi, Siddhartha (19 March 1997), "A recursion and a combinatorial formula for Jack polynomials", Inventiones Mathematicae, 128 (1): 9–22, arXiv:q-alg/9610016, Bibcode:1997InMat.128....9K, doi:10.1007/s002220050134, S2CID 7188322
- Macdonald, I. G. (1995), Symmetric functions and Hall polynomials, Oxford Mathematical Monographs (2nd ed.), New York: Oxford University Press, ISBN 978-0-19-853489-1, MR 1354144
- Stanley, Richard P. (1989), "Some combinatorial properties of Jack symmetric functions", Advances in Mathematics, 77 (1): 76–115, doi:10.1016/0001-8708(89)90015-7, MR 1014073.
