= E. H. Moore Research Article Prize =

The E. H. Moore Research Article Prize, also called the Moore Prize, is one of twenty-two prizes given out by the American Mathematical Society (AMS). It recognizes an outstanding research article to have appeared in one of the AMS primary research journals during the previous six years. The prize was funded in 2002 in memory of the former AMS president E. H. Moore. Beginning in 2004, it is awarded every three years at the Joint Mathematics Meetings and carries a cash reward of $5,000.

== Recipients ==
- 2004 Mark Haiman for "Hilbert schemes, polygraphs, and the Macdonald positivity conjecture", J. Amer. Math. Soc. (2001)
- 2007 Ivan Shestakov and Ualbai Umirbaev for "The tame and the wild automorphisms of polynomial rings in three variables," J. Amer. Math. Soc. (2004) and "Poisson brackets and two-generated subalgebras of rings of polynomials," J. Amer. Math. Soc. (2004)
- 2010 Sorin Popa for "On the superrigidity of malleable actions with spectral gap," J. Amer. Math. Soc. (2008)
- 2013 Michael J. Larsen and Richard Pink for "Finite subgroups of algebraic group," J. Amer. Math. Soc. (2011)
- 2016 Caucher Birkar, Paolo Cascini, Christopher Hacon, and James McKernan for "Existence of minimal models for varieties of log general type," J. Amer. Math. Soc. (2010)
- 2019 Ciprian Manolescu for "Pin(2)-equivariant Seiberg–Witten Floer homology and the triangulation conjecture," J. Amer. Math. Soc. (2016)
- 2022 Piotr Przytycki and Daniel Wise for "Mixed 3-manifolds are virtually special," J. Amer. Math. Soc. (2018)
- 2025 Mark Gross, Paul Hacking, Seán Keel and Maxim Kontsevich for "Canonical bases for cluster algebras," J. Amer. Math. Soc., Volume 31, Number 2, April 2018, pp. 497–608.

== See also ==
- List of mathematics awards
