= Zonal polynomial =

In mathematics, a zonal polynomial is a multivariate symmetric homogeneous polynomial. The zonal polynomials form a basis of the space of symmetric polynomials. Zonal polynomials appear in special functions with matrix argument which on the other hand appear in matrixvariate distributions such as the Wishart distribution when integrating over compact Lie groups. The theory was started in multivariate statistics in the 1960s and 1970s in a series of papers by Alan Treleven James and his doctoral student Alan Graham Constantine.

They appear as zonal spherical functions of the Gelfand pairs $(S_{2n},H_n)$ (here, $H_n$ is the hyperoctahedral group) and $(Gl_n(\mathbb{R}), O_n)$, which means that they describe canonical basis of the double class algebras $\mathbb{C}[H_n \backslash S_{2n} / H_n]$ and $\mathbb{C}[O_d(\mathbb{R})\backslash M_d(\mathbb{R})/O_d(\mathbb{R})]$.

The zonal polynomials are the $\alpha=2$ case of the C normalization of the Jack function.

== Literature ==
- Robb Muirhead, Aspects of Multivariate Statistical Theory, John Wiley & Sons, Inc., New York, 1984.
