= Mori dream space =

Geometric projective variety

In algebraic geometry, a Mori dream space is a projective variety whose cone of effective divisors has a well-behaved decomposition into certain convex sets called "Mori chambers". Hu and Keel showed that Mori dream spaces are quotients of affine varieties by torus actions. The notion is named so because it behaves nicely from the point of view of Mori's minimal model program.

== Examples and properties ==
Any quasi-smooth projective spherical variety (in particular, any quasi-smooth projective toric variety) as well as any log Fano 3-fold is a Mori dream space. In general, it is difficult to find a non-trivial example of a Mori dream space, as being a Mori Dream Space is equivalent to all (multi-)section rings being finitely generated.

It has been shown that a variety which admits a surjective morphism from a Mori dream space is again a Mori dream space.

== See also ==
- Spherical variety
