= Macdonald conjecture =

Macdonald conjecture may refer to one of several conjectures:

- Macdonald's conjectures about Macdonald polynomials
- Macdonald's generalization of the Dyson conjecture
- Macdonald's generalization of the Mehta integral
