= Wonderful compactification =

In algebraic group theory, a wonderful compactification of a variety acted on by an algebraic group $G$ is a $G$-equivariant compactification such that the closure of each orbit is smooth. Corrado de Concini and Claudio Procesi (1983) constructed a wonderful compactification of any symmetric variety given by a quotient $G/G^{\sigma}$ of an algebraic group $G$ by the subgroup $G^{\sigma}$ fixed by some involution $\sigma$ of $G$ over the complex numbers, sometimes called the De Concini–Procesi compactification. Elisabetta Strickland (1987) generalized this construction to arbitrary characteristic. In particular, by writing a group $G$ itself as a symmetric homogeneous space, $G=(G \times G)/G$ (modulo the diagonal subgroup), this gives a wonderful compactification of the group $G$ itself.
