= Henry Jack =

Scottish mathematician

- Born: 6 July 1917
- Died: 5 January 1978 (aged 60)
- Known for: Jack function
- Scientific career
- Fields: Mathematics

Henry Jack FRSE (6 July 1917 – 5 January 1978) was a Scottish mathematician at University College Dundee. The Jack polynomials are named after him. His research dealt with the development of analytic methods to evaluate certain integrals over matrix spaces. His most famous paper relates his integrals to classes of symmetric polynomials important in the theory of the representation of the symmetric group. He discovered a new, natural basis for the symmetric polynomials.

== Life ==
He was born at Menzieshill near Dundee on 6 July 1917, the son of Henry Jack, a farmer. He was christened at Benvie church. He was educated at the High School of Dundee then studied Mathematics at the University of Edinburgh (graduating MA in 1940). During the Second World War he served as a meteorologist with the RAF then resumed studies at Cambridge University, gaining a further BA degree in 1949.

In 1950 he was appointed as a lecturer in mathematics at University College Dundee, then a college of the University of St Andrews, but later to be the University of Dundee. He was appointed senior lecturer in 1964 and promoted to a readership in 1970.

In 1970 he was elected a Fellow of the Royal Society of Edinburgh. His proposers were W Norrie Everitt, D S Jones, John Frank Allen, Robert Alexander Rankin and Anthony Elliot Ritchie. He won the Society's Keith Prize for the period 1967/69.

He died of liver cancer at home at 77 Blackness Avenue in Dundee on 5 January 1978.

== Family ==
He was married to Jean Mills ("Winkie") in 1956. She was a widow with three sons at the time of their marriage.
