= Bożena Kostek =

Polish acoustical engineer and computer scientist

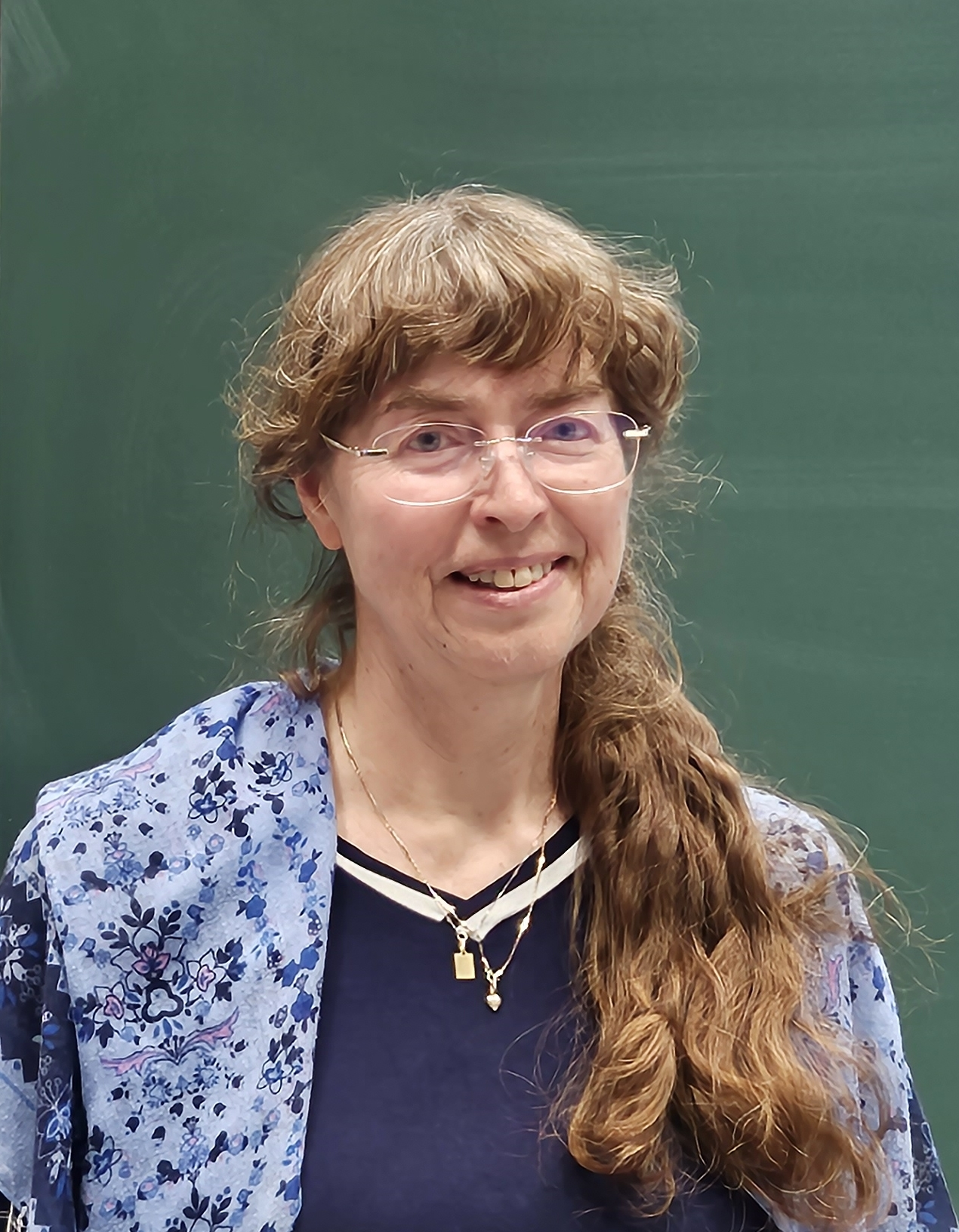
Kostek in 2023

Bożena Kostek is a Polish acoustical engineer and computer scientist known for her research applying artificial intelligence to the automatic classification of music. She is a professor in the Faculty of Electronics, Telecommunications and Informatics at the Gdańsk University of Technology, where she heads the Audio Acoustics Laboratory.

== Education and career ==
Kostek received master's degrees in 1983 and 1986 from the Gdańsk University of Technology, in sound engineering and management, respectively. Next, she studied at Toulouse III - Paul Sabatier University in France, where she received a diplôme d'études approfondies, another master's degree, in 1989. After continued studies in France, she returned to the Gdańsk University of Technology for a 1992 Ph.D. concerning the control systems in pipe organs. She received a Doctor of Science degree in 2000 through the Polish Academy of Sciences in 2000, and was named as a professor by the president of Poland (the highest-level academic degree in Poland) in 2005.

She has been affiliated as an academic at the Gdańsk University of Technology since 1986. She was vice-chair of the Multimedia Systems Department from 2003 to 2006, and is now a full professor. She is also the former editor-in-chief of the open-access journal Archives of Acoustics.

== Books ==
Kostek's books include:

- Soft Computing in Acoustics: Applications of Neural Networks, Fuzzy Logic and Rough Sets to Musical Acoustics (Springer, 1999)
- Computer Technology Applications to Audiology and Speech Therapy (in Polish, 2002, with A. Czyżewski, K. Kochanek, And H. Skarżyński)
- Perception-based Data Processing in Acoustics: Applications to Music Information Retrieval and Psychophysiology of Hearing (Springer, 2005)

== Recognition ==
Kostek is a 2002 recipient of the Silver Cross of Merit of the Republic of Poland, and a 2011 recipient of the Knight's Cross of the Order of Polonia Restituta.

She was named as a Fellow of the Acoustical Society of America in 2020, "for contributions to musical acoustics, artificial intelligence, and education". She was also elected as a Fellow of the Audio Engineering Society in 2010, and as a member of the Polish Academy of Sciences in 2013.
