= Kostka number =

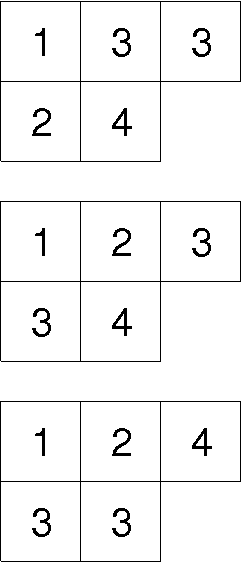
The three semistandard Young tableaux of shape $\lambda = (3, 2)$ and weight $\mu = (1, 1, 2, 1)$. They are counted by the Kostka number $K_{\lambda \mu} = 3$.

In mathematics, the Kostka number $K_{\lambda \mu}$ (depending on two integer partitions $\lambda$ and $\mu$) is a non-negative integer that is equal to the number of semistandard Young tableaux of shape $\lambda$ and weight $\mu$. They were introduced by the mathematician Carl Kostka in his study of symmetric functions (Kostka (1882)).

For example, if $\lambda = (3, 2)$ and $\mu = (1, 1, 2, 1)$, the Kostka number $K_{\lambda \mu}$ counts the number of ways to fill a left-aligned collection of boxes with 3 boxes in the first row and 2 boxes in the second row with 1 copy of the number 1, 1 copy of the number 2, 2 copies of the number 3 and 1 copy of the number 4 such that the entries increase along columns and do not decrease along rows. The three such tableaux are shown at right, and $K_{(3, 2) (1, 1, 2, 1)} = 3$.

== Examples and special cases ==
For any partition $\lambda$, the Kostka number $K_{\lambda \lambda}$ is equal to 1: the unique way to fill the Young diagram of shape $\lambda = (\lambda_1,\dotsc,\lambda_m)$ with $\lambda_1$ copies of 1, $\lambda_2$ copies of 2, and so on, so that the resulting tableau is weakly increasing along rows and strictly increasing along columns is if all the 1s are placed in the first row, all the 2s are placed in the second row, and so on. (This tableau is sometimes called the Yamanouchi tableau of shape $\lambda$.)

The Kostka number $K_{\lambda \mu}$ is positive (i.e., there exist semistandard Young tableaux of shape $\lambda$ and weight $\mu$) if and only if $\lambda$ and $\mu$ are both partitions of the same integer $n$ and $\lambda$ is greater than or equal to $\mu$ in dominance order.

In general, there are no nice formulas known for the Kostka numbers. However, some special cases are known. For example, if $\mu = (1,1,\dotsc,1)$ is the partition whose parts are all 1 then a semistandard Young tableau of weight $\mu$ is a standard Young tableau; the number of standard Young tableaux of a given shape $\lambda$ is given by the hook-length formula.

== Properties ==
An important simple property of Kostka numbers is that $K_{\lambda \mu}$ does not depend on the order of entries of $\mu$. For example, $K_{(3,2) (1, 1, 2, 1)} = K_{(3,2) (1, 1, 1, 2)}$. This is not immediately obvious from the definition but can be shown by establishing a bijection between the sets of semistandard Young tableaux of shape $\lambda$ and weights $\mu$ and $\mu^\prime$, where $\mu$ and $\mu^\prime$ differ only by swapping two entries.

== Kostka numbers, symmetric functions and representation theory ==
In addition to the purely combinatorial definition above, they can also be defined as the coefficients that arise when one expresses the Schur polynomial $s_\lambda$ as a linear combination of monomial symmetric functions $m_\mu$:

$$s_\lambda= \sum_\mu K_{\lambda \mu}m_\mu,$$

where $\lambda$ and $\mu$ are both partitions of $n$. Alternatively, Schur polynomials can also be expressed as

$$s_\lambda= \sum_\alpha K_{\lambda \alpha} x^\alpha,$$

where the sum is over all weak compositions $\alpha$ of $n$ and $x^\alpha$ denotes the monomial $x_{1}^{\alpha_1} x_{2}^{\alpha_2} \dotsc x_{n}^{\alpha_n}$.

On the level of representations of the symmetric group $S_n$, Kostka numbers express the decomposition of the permutation module $M_\mu$ in terms of the irreducible representations $V_\lambda$ where $\lambda$ is a partition of $n$, i.e.,

$$M_\mu = \bigoplus_{\lambda} K_{\lambda \mu} V_\lambda.$$

On the level of representations of the general linear group $\mathrm{GL}_d(\mathbb{C})$, the Kostka number $K_{\lambda \mu}$ also counts the dimension of the weight space corresponding to $\mu$ in the unitary irreducible representation $U_\lambda$ (where we require $\mu$ and $\lambda$ to have at most $d$ parts).

== Examples ==
The Kostka numbers for partitions of size at most 3 are as follows:

$$K_{\varnothing \varnothing} = 1,$$
$$K_{(1) (1)} = 1,$$
$$K_{(2) (2)} = K_{(2) (1,1)} = 1,$$
$$K_{(1,1) (2)} = 0, \, K_{(1,1) (1,1)} = 1,$$
$$K_{(3) (3)} = K_{(3) (2,1)} = K_{(3) (1,1,1)} = 1,$$
$$K_{(2,1) (3)} = 0, \, K_{(2,1) (2,1)} = 1, \, K_{(2,1) (1,1,1)} = 2,$$
$$K_{(1,1,1) (3)} = K_{(1,1,1) (2,1)} = 0, \, K_{(1,1,1) (1,1,1)} = 1 .$$

These values are exactly the coefficients in the expansions of Schur functions in terms of monomial symmetric functions:

$$s_\varnothing = m_\varnothing = 1$$
$$s_{(1)} = m_{(1)}$$
$$s_{(2)} = m_{(2)} + m_{(1,1)}$$
$$s_{(1,1)} = m_{(1,1)}$$
$$s_{(3)} = m_{(3)} + m_{(2,1)} + m_{(1,1,1)}$$
$$s_{(2,1)} = m_{(2,1)} + 2 m_{(1,1,1)}$$
$$s_{(1,1,1)} = m_{(1,1,1)}$$

Kostka (1882, pages 118-120) gave tables of these numbers for partitions of numbers up to 8.

== Generalizations ==
Kostka numbers are special values of the 1 or 2 variable Kostka polynomials:

$$K_{\lambda\mu}= K_{\lambda\mu}(1)=K_{\lambda\mu}(0,1).$$
