= Vadim Knizhnik =

Russian physicist

Vadim Genrikhovich Knizhnik (Russian: Вади́м Ге́нрихович Кни́жник; 20 February 1962 – 25 December 1987) was a Soviet physicist of Jewish and Russian descent.

== Biography ==
Knizhnik was born in Kiev in 1962, and studied physics from 1978 to 1984 at the Moscow Institute for Physics and Technology. He has received his PhD at the Landau Institute for Theoretical Physics. His supervisor was Prof. A. Polyakov, however, at the time of his PhD courses ("aspirantship") Vadim was already a first-class physicist, and supervising him was a pure formality. In 1986 he became a member of the Landau Institute. His distinguished abilities showed quite early. At the secondary school he won twice the USSR national physics olympiad. He wrote his first scientific article (in collaboration with Prof. L. Andreev) as a student in 1982. This article has dealt with kinetic properties of quantum crystals. From 1984 he turned to quantum field theory and made very important contributions to string theory. Knizhnik died of a heart attack in Moscow at the age of 25.

== See also ==
- Knizhnik–Zamolodchikov equations
