= Claudio Procesi =

Italian mathematician (born 1941)

Claudio Procesi (born 31 March 1941 in Rome) is an Italian mathematician, known for works in algebra and representation theory.

== Career ==
Procesi studied at the Sapienza University of Rome, where he received his degree (Laurea) in 1963. In 1966 he graduated from the University of Chicago advised by Israel Herstein, with a thesis titled "On rings with polynomial identities". From 1966 he was assistant professor at the University of Rome, 1970 associate professor at the University of Lecce, and 1971 at the University of Pisa. From 1973 he was full professor in Pisa and in 1975 ordinary Professor at the Sapienza University of Rome. He was a visiting scientist at Columbia University (1969–1970), the University of California, Los Angeles (1973/74), at the Instituto Nacional de Matemática Pura e Aplicada, at the Massachusetts Institute of Technology (1991), at the University of Grenoble, at Brandeis University (1981/2), at the University of Texas at Austin (1984), the Institute for Advanced Study (1994), the Mathematical Sciences Research Institute (1992, etc.), at the International Centre for Theoretical Physics in Trieste, and at the École Normale Supérieure.

Procesi studies noncommutative algebra, algebraic groups, invariant theory, enumerative geometry, infinite dimensional algebras and quantum groups, polytopes, braid groups, cyclic homology, geometry of orbits of compact groups, arrangements of subspaces and tori.

Procesi proved that the polynomial invariants of $n \times n$ matrices over a field $K$ all come from the Hamilton-Cayley theorem, which says that a square matrix satisfies its own characteristic polynomial.

In 1981 he was awarded the Medal of the Accademia dei Lincei, of which he is a member since 1987. In 1986 he received the Feltrinelli Prize in mathematics. In 1978 he was an invited speaker at the International Congress of Mathematicians (ICM) in Helsinki. From 2007 to 2010 he is a vice-president of the International Mathematical Union. He was an editor of the Duke Mathematical Journal, the Journal of Algebra, Communications in Algebra, and Advances in Mathematics. Furthermore, he was on the committee of the Abel Prize and the algebra committee for the ICM 1986–1994.

== Personal life ==
Procesi is the father of Michela Procesi, also a mathematician.

== Works ==
=== Articles ===
- De Mari, Filippo; Procesi, Claudio; Shayman, Mark A. (1992). "Hessenberg varieties". Transactions of the American Mathematical Society. 332 (2): 529–534. doi:10.1090/S0002-9947-1992-1043857-6. MR 1043857.
- de Concini, Corrado; Kac, Victor G.; Procesi, Claudio (1992). "Quantum coadjoint action". Journal of the American Mathematical Society. 5 (1): 151–189. doi:10.1090/S0894-0347-1992-1124981-X. MR 1124981.
- with Lieven Le Bruyn: Le Bruyn, Lieven; Procesi, Claudio (1990). "Semisimple representations of quivers" (PDF). Transactions of the American Mathematical Society. 317 (2): 585–598. doi:10.1090/S0002-9947-1990-0958897-0.
- with Corrado de Concini and George Lusztig: De Concini, C.; Lusztig, G.; Procesi, C. (1988). "Homology of the zero-set of a nilpotent vector field on a flag manifold". Journal of the American Mathematical Society. 1: 15–34. doi:10.1090/S0894-0347-1988-0924700-2.
- Procesi, Claudio (1976a). "The invariants of $n \times n$ matrices". Bulletin of the American Mathematical Society. 82 (6): 891–892. doi:10.1090/S0002-9904-1976-14196-1.
- Procesi, Claudio (1976b). "Invariant theory of $n \times n$ matrices". Advances in Mathematics. 19 (3): 306–381. doi:10.1016/0001-8708(76)90027-x.

=== Books ===
- 2017: (with Corrado de Concini) The Invariant Theory of Matrices, American Mathematical Society
- 2010: (with Corrado de Concini) Topics in Hyperplane Arrangements, Polytopes and Box-Splines, Springer MR 2722776
- 2006: Lie groups: An approach through invariants and representations, Springer, Universitext
- 1996: (with Hanspeter Kraft) Classical Invariant Theory
- 1993: (with Corrado de Concini) Quantum groups, Lecture Notes in Mathematics, Springer MR 1288995
- 1993: Rings with polynomial identities, Dekker MR 0366968
- 1983: A primer on invariant theory, Brandeis University

== See also ==
- Hessenberg variety
- Hodge algebra
- Wonderful compactification
- Procesi bundle
