= Kostka polynomial =

Certain family of polynomials

In mathematics, Kostka polynomials, named after the mathematician Carl Kostka, are families of polynomials that generalize the Kostka numbers. They are studied primarily in algebraic combinatorics and representation theory.

The two-variable Kostka polynomials K_{λμ}(q, t) are known by several names including Kostka–Foulkes polynomials, Macdonald–Kostka polynomials or q,t-Kostka polynomials. Here the indices λ and μ are integer partitions and K_{λμ}(q, t) is polynomial in the variables q and t. Sometimes one considers single-variable versions of these polynomials that arise by setting q = 0, i.e., by considering the polynomial K_{λμ}(t) = K_{λμ}(0, t).

There are two slightly different versions of them, one called transformed Kostka polynomials.

The one-variable specializations of the Kostka polynomials can be used to relate Hall-Littlewood polynomials P_{μ} to Schur polynomials s_{λ}:

$$s_\lambda(x_1,\ldots,x_n) =\sum_\mu K_{\lambda\mu}(t)P_\mu(x_1,\ldots,x_n;t).\$$

These polynomials were conjectured to have non-negative integer coefficients by Foulkes, and this was later proved in 1978 by Alain Lascoux and Marcel-Paul Schützenberger. In fact, they show that

$$K_{\lambda\mu}(t) = \sum_{T \in SSYT(\lambda,\mu)} t^{charge(T)}$$

where the sum is taken over all semi-standard Young tableaux with shape λ and weight μ. Here, charge is a certain combinatorial statistic on semi-standard Young tableaux.

The Macdonald–Kostka polynomials can be used to relate Macdonald polynomials (also denoted by P_{μ}) to Schur polynomials s_{λ}:

$$s_\lambda(x_1,\ldots,x_n) =\sum_\mu K_{\lambda\mu}(q,t)J_\mu(x_1,\ldots,x_n;q,t)\$$

where

$$J_\mu(x_1,\ldots,x_n;q,t) = P_\mu(x_1,\ldots,x_n;q,t)\prod_{s\in\mu}(1-q^{arm(s)}t^{leg(s)+1}).\$$

Kostka numbers are special values of the one- or two-variable Kostka polynomials:

$$K_{\lambda\mu}= K_{\lambda\mu}(1)=K_{\lambda\mu}(0,1).\$$
