= Knizhnik–Zamolodchikov equations =

Partial differential equations of correlation functions

In mathematical physics the Knizhnik–Zamolodchikov equations, or KZ equations, are linear differential equations satisfied by the correlation functions (on the Riemann sphere) of two-dimensional conformal field theories associated with an affine Lie algebra at a fixed level. They form a system of complex partial differential equations with regular singular points satisfied by the N-point functions of affine primary fields and can be derived using either the formalism of Lie algebras or that of vertex algebras.

The structure of the genus-zero part of the conformal field theory is encoded in the monodromy properties of these equations. In particular, the braiding and fusion of the primary fields (or their associated representations) can be deduced from the properties of the four-point functions, for which the equations reduce to a single matrix-valued first-order complex ordinary differential equation of Fuchsian type.

Originally the Russian physicists Vadim Knizhnik and Alexander Zamolodchikov derived the equations for the SU(2) Wess–Zumino–Witten model using the classical formulas of Gauss for the connection coefficients of the hypergeometric differential equation.

== Definition ==
Let $\hat{\mathfrak{g}}_k$ denote the affine Lie algebra with level k and dual Coxeter number h. Let v be a vector from a zero mode representation of $\hat{\mathfrak{g}}_k$ and $\Phi(v,z)$ the primary field associated with it. Let $t^a$ be a basis of the underlying Lie algebra $\mathfrak{g}$, $t^a_i$ their representation on the primary field $\Phi(v_i,z)$ and η the Killing form. Then for $i,j=1,2,\ldots,N$ the Knizhnik–Zamolodchikov equations read

$$\left( (k+h)\partial_{z_i} + \sum_{j \neq i} \frac{\sum_{a,b} \eta_{ab} t^a_i \otimes t^b_j}{z_i-z_j} \right) \left \langle \Phi(v_N,z_N)\dots\Phi(v_1,z_1) \right \rangle = 0.$$

== Informal derivation ==
The Knizhnik–Zamolodchikov equations result from the Sugawara construction of the Virasoro algebra from the affine Lie algebra. More specifically, they result from applying the identity

$$L_{-1} = \frac{1}{2(k+h)} \sum_{m \in \mathbf{Z}} \sum_{a, b}  \eta_{ab}J^a_{-m}J^b_{m-1}$$

to the affine primary field $\Phi(v_i,z_i)$ in a correlation function of affine primary fields. In this context, only the terms $k=0,1$ are non-vanishing. The action of $J^a_{-1}$ can then be rewritten using global Ward identities,

$$\left( \left(J^a_{-1}\right)_i
+ \sum_{j\neq i} \frac{t^a_j}{z_i-z_j}
\right)
\left\langle \Phi(v_N,z_N)\dots \Phi(v_1,z_1)\right\rangle = 0,$$

and $L_{-1}$ can be identified with the infinitesimal translation operator $\frac{\partial}{\partial z}$.

== Mathematical formulation ==
Since the treatment in Tsuchiya & Kanie (1988), the Knizhnik–Zamolodchikov equation has been formulated mathematically in the language of vertex algebras due to Borcherds (1986) and Frenkel, Lepowsky & Meurman (1988). This approach was popularized amongst theoretical physicists by Goddard (1989) and amongst mathematicians by Kac (1997).

The vacuum representation H_{0} of an affine Kac–Moody algebra at a fixed level can be encoded in a vertex algebra. The derivation d acts as the energy operator L_{0} on H_{0}, which can be written as a direct sum of the non-negative integer eigenspaces of L_{0}, the zero energy space being generated by the vacuum vector Ω. The eigenvalue of an eigenvector of L_{0} is called its energy. For every state a in L there is a vertex operator V(a,z) which creates a from the vacuum vector Ω, in the sense that

$$V(a,0)\Omega = a.$$

The vertex operators of energy 1 correspond to the generators of the affine algebra

$$X(z)=\sum X(n) z^{-n-1}$$

where X ranges over the elements of the underlying finite-dimensional simple complex Lie algebra $\mathfrak{g}$.

There is an energy 2 eigenvector L_{−2}Ω which give the generators L_{n} of the Virasoro algebra associated to the Kac–Moody algebra by the Segal–Sugawara construction

$$T(z) = \sum L_n z^{-n-2}.$$

If a has energy α, then the corresponding vertex operator has the form

$$V(a,z) = \sum V(a,n)z^{-n-\alpha}.$$

The vertex operators satisfy

$$\begin{align}
\frac{d}{dz} V(a,z) &= \left [L_{-1},V(a,z) \right ]= V \left (L_{-1}a,z \right ) \\
\left [L_0,V(a,z) \right ] &= \left (z^{-1} \frac{d}{dz} + \alpha \right )V(a,z)
\end{align}$$

as well as the locality and associativity relations

$$V(a,z)V(b,w) = V(b,w) V(a,z) = V(V(a,z-w)b,w).$$

These last two relations are understood as analytic continuations: the inner products with finite energy vectors of the three expressions define the same polynomials in z^{±1}, w^{±1} and (z − w)^{−1} in the domains |z| < |w|, |z| > |w| and |z – w| < |w|. All the structural relations of the Kac–Moody and Virasoro algebra can be recovered from these relations, including the Segal–Sugawara construction.

Every other integral representation H_{i} at the same level becomes a module for the vertex algebra, in the sense that for each a there is a vertex operator V_{i}(a, z) on H_{i} such that

$$V_i(a,z)V_i(b,w) = V_i(b,w) V_i(a,z)=V_i(V(a,z-w)b,w).$$

The most general vertex operators at a given level are intertwining operators Φ(v, z) between representations H_{i} and H_{j} where v lies in H_{k}. These operators can also be written as

$$\Phi(v,z)=\sum \Phi(v,n) z^{-n-\delta}$$

but δ can now be rational numbers. Again these intertwining operators are characterized by properties

$$V_j(a,z) \Phi(v,w)= \Phi(v,w) V_i(a,w) = \Phi \left (V_k(a,z-w)v,w \right)$$

and relations with L_{0} and L_{−1} similar to those above.

When v is in the lowest energy subspace for L_{0} on H_{k}, an irreducible representation of $\mathfrak{g}$, the operator Φ(v, w) is called a primary field of charge k.

Given a chain of n primary fields starting and ending at H_{0}, their correlation or n-point function is defined by

$$\left \langle \Phi(v_1,z_1) \Phi(v_2,z_2) \cdots \Phi(v_n,z_n) \right \rangle = \left(\Phi \left (v_1,z_1 \right ) \Phi \left (v_2,z_2 \right ) \cdots \Phi \left (v_n,z_n \right ) \Omega, \Omega \right ).$$

In the physics literature the v_{i} are often suppressed and the primary field written Φ_{i}(z_{i}), with the understanding that it is labelled by the corresponding irreducible representation of $\mathfrak{g}$.

=== Vertex algebra derivation ===
If (X_{s}) is an orthonormal basis of $\mathfrak{g}$ for the Killing form, the Knizhnik–Zamolodchikov equations may be deduced by integrating the correlation function

$$\sum_s \left \langle X_s(w)X_s(z)\Phi(v_1,z_1) \cdots \Phi(v_n,z_n) \right \rangle (w-z)^{-1}$$

first in the w variable around a small circle centred at z; by Cauchy's theorem the result can be expressed as sum of integrals around n small circles centred at the z_{j}'s:

$${1\over 2}(k+h) \left \langle T(z)\Phi(v_1,z_1)\cdots \Phi(v_n,z_n) \right \rangle = - \sum_{j,s} \left \langle X_s(z)\Phi(v_1,z_1) \cdots \Phi(X_s v_j,z_j) \cdots \Phi(v_n,z_n) \right \rangle (z-z_j)^{-1}.$$

Integrating both sides in the z variable about a small circle centred on z_{i} yields the i^{th} Knizhnik–Zamolodchikov equation.

=== Lie algebra derivation ===
It is also possible to deduce the Knizhnik–Zamodchikov equations without explicit use of vertex algebras. The termΦ(v_{i}, z_{i}) may be replaced in the correlation function by its commutator with L_{r} where r = 0, ±1. The result can be expressed in terms of the derivative with respect to z_{i}. On the other hand, L_{r} is also given by the Segal–Sugawara formula:

$$\begin{align}
L_0 &= (k+h)^{-1}\sum_s\left[ \frac{1}{2}X_s(0)^2 + \sum_{m>0} X_s(-m)X_s(m)\right] \\
L_{\pm 1 } &=(k+h)^{-1} \sum_s\sum_{ m\ge 0} X_s(-m\pm 1)X_s(m)
\end{align}$$

After substituting these formulas for L_{r}, the resulting expressions can be simplified using the commutator formulas

$$[X(m),\Phi(a,n)]= \Phi(Xa,m+n).$$

=== Original derivation ===
The original proof of Knizhnik & Zamolodchikov (1984), reproduced in Tsuchiya & Kanie (1988), uses a combination of both of the above methods. First note that for X in $\mathfrak{g}$

$$\left \langle X(z)\Phi(v_1,z_1) \cdots \Phi(v_n,z_n) \right \rangle = \sum_j \left \langle \Phi(v_1,z_1)\cdots \Phi(Xv_j,z_j) \cdots \Phi(v_n,z_n) \right \rangle (z-z_j)^{-1}.$$

Hence

$$\sum_s \langle X_s(z)\Phi(z_1,v_1) \cdots \Phi(X_sv_i,z_i) \cdots \Phi(v_n,z_n)\rangle = \sum_j\sum_s \langle\cdots \Phi(X_s v_j, z_j) \cdots \Phi(X_s v_i,z_i) \cdots\rangle (z-z_j)^{-1}.$$

On the other hand,

$$\sum_s X_s(z)\Phi \left (X_sv_i,z_i \right ) = (z-z_i)^{-1} \Phi \left (\sum_s X_s^2v_i,z_i \right ) + (k+g){\partial\over \partial z_i} \Phi(v_i,z_i) +O(z-z_i)$$

so that

$$(k+g)\frac{\partial}{\partial z_i} \Phi(v_i,z_i) = \lim_{z\to z_i} \left[\sum_s X_s(z)\Phi \left (X_sv_i,z_i \right ) -(z-z_i)^{-1}\Phi \left (\sum_s X_s^2 v_i,z_i \right )\right].$$

The result follows by using this limit in the previous equality.

== Monodromy representation of KZ equation ==
In conformal field theory along the above definition the n-point correlation function of the primary field satisfies KZ equation. In particular, for $\mathfrak{sl}_2$ and non negative integers k there are $k + 1$ primary fields $\Phi_j(z_j)$ 's corresponding to spin _{j} representation ($j = 0, 1/2, 1, 3/2,\ldots , k/2$). The correlation function $\Psi(z_1,\dots,z_n)$ of the primary fields $\Phi_j(z_j)$ 's for the representation $(\rho,V_i)$ takes values in the tensor product $V_1\otimes\cdots\otimes V_n$ and its KZ equation is

$$(k+2)\frac{\partial}{\partial z_i}\Psi=\sum_{i,j\ne i}\frac{\Omega_{ij}}{z_i-z_j}\Psi$$,

where $\Omega_{ij}=\sum_a\rho_i(J^a)\otimes\rho_j(J_a)$ as the above informal derivation.

This n-point correlation function can be analytically continued as multi-valued holomorphic function to the domain $X_n \subset \Complex^n$ with $z_i\ne z_j$ for $i\ne j$. Due to this analytic continuation, the holonomy of the KZ equation can be described by the braid group $B_n$ introduced by Emil Artin. In general, A complex semi-simple Lie algebra $\mathfrak{g}$ and its representations $(\rho,V_i)$ give the linear representation of braid group

$$\theta \colon B_n \rightarrow V_1\otimes\cdots\otimes V_n$$

as the holonomy of KZ equation. Oppositely, a KZ equation gives the linear representation of braid groups as its holonomy.

The action on $V_1\otimes\dots\otimes V_n$ by the analytic continuation of KZ equation is called monodromy representation of KZ equation. In particular, if all $V_i$ 's have spin _{1/2} representation then the linear representation obtained from KZ equation agrees with the representation constructed from operator algebra theory by Vaughan Jones. It is known that the monodromy representation of KZ equation with a general semi-simple Lie algebra agrees with the linear representation of braid group given by R-matrix of the corresponding quantum group.

== KZ-BPZ relation ==
In the case when the underlying Lie algebra is $\mathfrak{g}=\mathfrak{sl}(2)$, the KZ equations are mapped to BPZ equations by Sklyanin's separation of variables for the $\mathfrak{sl}(2)$ Gaudin model.

== Applications ==
- Representation theory of affine Lie algebra and quantum groups
- Braid groups
- Topology of hyperplane complements
- Knot theory and 3-folds

== See also ==
- Quantum KZ equations
