= Plethystic substitution =

Shorthand notation in the algebra

Plethystic substitution is a shorthand notation for a common kind of substitution in the algebra of symmetric functions and that of symmetric polynomials. It is essentially basic substitution of variables, but allows for a change in the number of variables used.

== Definition ==
The formal definition of plethystic substitution relies on the fact that the ring of symmetric functions $\Lambda_R(x_1,x_2,\ldots)$ is generated as an R-algebra by the power sum symmetric functions

$$p_k=x_1^k+x_2^k+x_3^k+\cdots.$$

For any symmetric function $f$ and any formal sum of monomials $A=a_1+a_2+\cdots$, the plethystic substitution f[A] is the formal series obtained by making the substitutions

$$p_k \longrightarrow a_1^k+a_2^k+a_3^k+\cdots$$

in the decomposition of $f$ as a polynomial in the p_{k}'s.

== Examples ==
If $X$ denotes the formal sum $X=x_1+x_2+\cdots$, then $f[X]=f(x_1,x_2,\ldots)$.

One can write $1/(1-t)$ to denote the formal sum $1+t+t^2+t^3+\cdots$, and so the plethystic substitution $f[1/(1-t)]$ is simply the result of setting $x_i=t^{i-1}$ for each i. That is,

$$f\left[\frac{1}{1-t}\right]=f(1,t,t^2,t^3,\ldots)$$.

Plethystic substitution can also be used to change the number of variables: if $X=x_1+x_2+\cdots + x_n$, then $f[X]=f(x_1,\ldots,x_n)$ is the corresponding symmetric function in the ring $\Lambda_R(x_1,\ldots,x_n)$ of symmetric functions in n variables.

Several other common substitutions are listed below. In all of the following examples, $X=x_1+x_2+\cdots$ and $Y=y_1+y_2+\cdots$ are formal sums.

- If $f$ is a homogeneous symmetric function of degree $d$, then
  $$f[tX]=t^d f(x_1,x_2,\ldots)$$
- If $f$ is a homogeneous symmetric function of degree $d$, then
  $$f[-X]=(-1)^d \omega f(x_1,x_2,\ldots)$$,

where $\omega$ is the well-known involution on symmetric functions that sends a Schur function $s_{\lambda}$ to the conjugate Schur function $s_{\lambda^\ast}$.

- The substitution $S:f\mapsto f[-X]$ is the antipode for the Hopf algebra structure on the Ring of symmetric functions.
- $p_n[X+Y]=p_n[X]+p_n[Y]$
- The map $\Delta: f\mapsto f[X+Y]$ is the coproduct for the Hopf algebra structure on the ring of symmetric functions.
- $h_n\left[X(1-t)\right]$ is the alternating Frobenius series for the exterior algebra of the defining representation of the symmetric group, where $h_n$ denotes the complete homogeneous symmetric function of degree $n$.
- $h_n\left[X/(1-t)\right]$ is the Frobenius series for the symmetric algebra of the defining representation of the symmetric group.
