= Carl Kostka =

German mathematician

Carl Gottfried Franz Albert Kostka (3 December 1846 in Lyck – 28 December 1921 in Insterburg) was a mathematician who introduced Kostka numbers in 1882. He lived and worked in Insterburg.

== See also ==
- Kostka polynomial
