= Corrado de Concini =

Italian mathematician (born 1949)

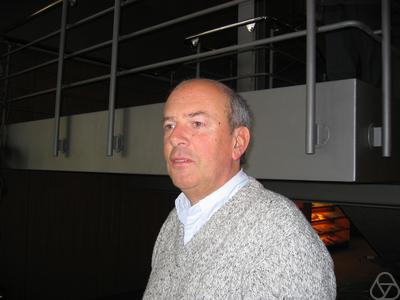
De Concini in 2003

Corrado de Concini (born 28 July 1949, in Rome) is an Italian mathematician and professor at the Sapienza University of Rome. He studies algebraic geometry, quantum groups, invariant theory, and mathematical physics.

== Life and work ==
He was born in Rome in 1949, the son of Ennio De Concini, a noted screenwriter and film director.

Corrado de Concini received in 1971 the mathematics degree from Sapienza University of Rome and in 1975 a Ph.D. from the University of Warwick under the supervision of George Lusztig (The mod-2 cohomology of the orthogonal groups over a finite field).

In 1975 he was a lecturer (Professore Incaricato) at the University of Salerno, and in 1976 was associate professor at the University of Pisa. In 1981 he went to the University of Rome, where in 1983 he was a professor of higher algebra. From 1988 to 1996 he was professor at the Scuola Normale Superiore in Pisa, and from 1996 to 2019 professor at the Sapienza University of Rome. Since 2020 he is emeritus professor at the Sapienza University of Rome

De Concini was also a visiting scientist at the Brandeis University, the Mittag-Leffler Institute (1981), the Tata Institute of Fundamental Research (1982), Harvard University (1987), the Massachusetts Institute of Technology (1989), the University of Paris VI, the Institut des Hautes Études Scientifiques (1992, 1996), the École Normale Supérieure (2004, Lagrange Michelet Chair), and the Mathematical Sciences Research Institute (2000, 2002).

From 2003 to 2007 he was president of Istituto Nazionale di Alta Matematica Francesco Severi.

In 1986 he was an invited speaker at the International Congress of Mathematicians in Berkeley (Equivariant embeddings of homogeneous spaces). In 1992, he held a plenary lecture on the first European Congress of Mathematicians in Paris (Representations of quantum groups at roots of 1). In 1986 he was awarded the Caccioppoli Prize. In 1990 he was awarded the gold medal of Accademia nazionale delle scienze. Since 1993 he is a corresponding member and since 2009 a full member of the Accademia dei Lincei and since 2005 a corresponding member of the Istituto Lombardo.

From 2021 to 2025 Corrado de Concini has been the president of the Accademia delle Scienze detta dei XL.

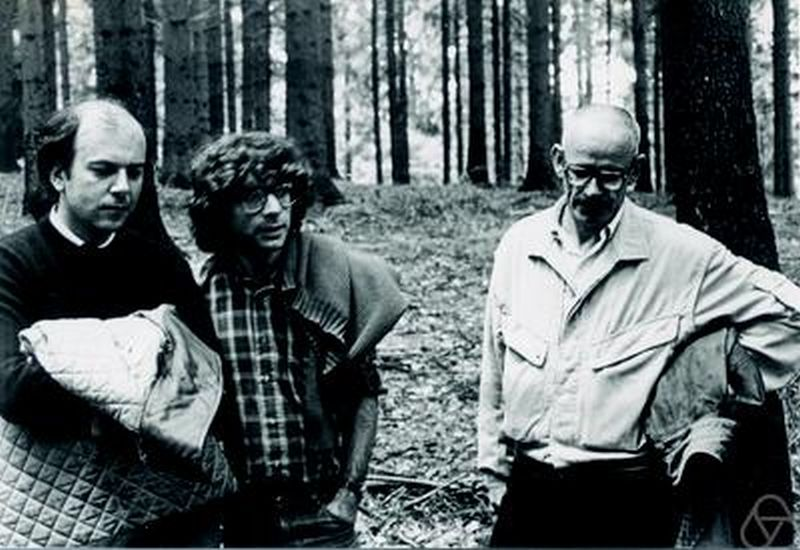
De Concini (left) in Oberwolfach 1984 with Eugene Trubowitz and Francesco Calogero

== Writings ==
- With Claudio Procesi: Topics in Hyperplane Arrangements, Polytopes and Box-Splines, Springer, 2010. MR 2722776
- With Claudio Procesi: Quantum groups, in: D-modules, representation theory, and quantum groups (Venice, 1992), 31–140, Lecture Notes in Math., vol. 1565, Springer, Berlin, 1993. MR 1288995

== See also ==
- Wonderful compactification
