= Stefan Kostka =

American music theorist, author

Stefan M. Kostka (born 1939) is an American music theorist, author, and professor emeritus of music theory at the University of Texas at Austin.

== Education ==
Kostka graduated from the University of Colorado Boulder with a bachelor's degree in 1962, and then received a graduate degree at the University of Texas, studying under Kent Kennan before receiving a PhD in music theory from the University of Wisconsin–Madison.

== Career ==
He was a member of the faculty of the Eastman School of Music from 1969 to 1973, and since that time has been on the faculty at the University Texas at Austin. Kostka initiated courses in computer applications in music at both the Eastman School and the University of Texas. Later, he specialized in courses in atonal theory and contemporary styles and techniques.

== Selected publications ==
=== Books ===
- The Hindemith String Quartets: A Computer-Assisted Study of Selected Aspects of Style, Doctoral dissertation, University of Wisconsin–Madison, 1969
- A Bibliography of Computer Applications in Music, J. Boonin, 1974
- Kostka, Stefan; Payne, Dorothy (1995) [1989 (Alfred E. Knopf)]. Tonal Harmony, with an Introduction to Twentieth-Century Music (3rd ed.). New York: McGraw-Hill. ISBN 0-07-035874-5.
- Materials and Techniques of Twentieth Century Music, Prentice Hall, 1990; 5th edition, Materials and Techniques of Post-Tonal Music, with Matthew Santa, Routledge, 2018.
- Anthology of Music for Analysis, with Roger Graybill, Prentice Hall, 2003

=== Articles ===
- 1971: "Recent developments in computer-assisted musical scholarship", Computers and the Humanities, volume 6, issue 1, pages 15–21
- 1991: (with Russell Riepe) "Changing philosophies of undergraduate music theory instruction: Practical implications and recommendations". The Quarterly Journal of Music Teaching and Learning. 2 (4): 30–37. Archived from the original on 2021-12-04.
