= James A. Wilson =

American mathematician

James Arthur Wilson is a mathematician working on special functions and orthogonal polynomials who introduced Wilson polynomials, Askey–Wilson polynomials, and the Askey–Wilson beta integral.
