= Ian G. Macdonald =

British mathematician (1928–2023)

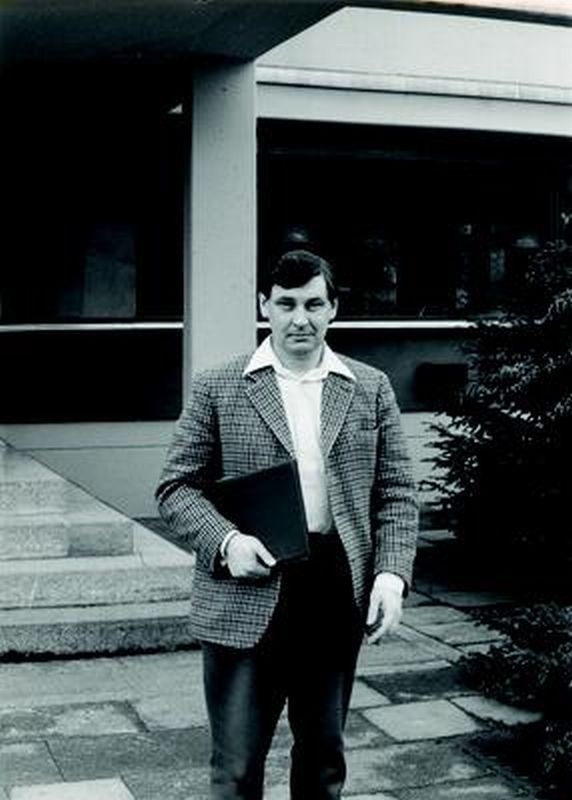
Macdonald at Oberwolfach in 1977

Ian Grant Macdonald FRS (11 October 1928 – 8 August 2023) was a British mathematician known for his contributions to symmetric functions, special functions, Lie algebra theory and other aspects of algebra, algebraic combinatorics, and combinatorics.

== Early life and education ==
Born in London, he was educated at Winchester College and Trinity College, Cambridge, graduating in 1952.

== Career ==
He then spent five years as a civil servant. He was offered a position at Manchester University in 1957 by Max Newman, on the basis of work he had done while outside academia. In 1960 he moved to the University of Exeter, and in 1963 became a Fellow of Magdalen College, Oxford. Macdonald became Fielden Professor at Manchester in 1972, and professor at Queen Mary College, University of London, in 1976.

He worked on symmetric products of algebraic curves, Jordan algebras and the representation theory of groups over local fields. In 1972 he proved the Macdonald identities, after a pattern known to Freeman Dyson. His 1979 book Symmetric Functions and Hall Polynomials has become a classic. Symmetric functions are an old theory, part of the theory of equations, to which both K-theory and representation theory lead. His was the first text to integrate much classical theory, such as Hall polynomials, Schur functions, the Littlewood–Richardson rule, with the abstract algebra approach. It was both an expository work and, in part, a research monograph, and had a major impact in the field. The Macdonald polynomials are now named after him. The Macdonald conjectures from 1982 also proved most influential.

Macdonald was elected a Fellow of the Royal Society in 1979. He was an invited speaker in 1970 at the International Congress of Mathematicians (ICM) in Nice and a plenary speaker in 1998 at the ICM in Berlin. In 1991 he received the Pólya Prize of the London Mathematical Society. In 2002 he received an honorary doctorate from the University of Amsterdam. He was awarded the 2009 Steele Prize for Mathematical Exposition. In 2012 he became a fellow of the American Mathematical Society.

== Personal life and death ==
Ian G. Macdonald died on 8 August 2023, at the age of 94.

== Selected publications ==
- Macdonald, I. G. Affine Hecke Algebras and Orthogonal Polynomials. Cambridge Tracts in Mathematics, 157. Cambridge University Press, Cambridge, 2003. x+175 pp. ISBN 0-521-82472-9 MR 1976581
- Macdonald, I. G. Symmetric Functions and Hall Polynomials. Second edition. Oxford Mathematical Monographs. Oxford Science Publications. The Clarendon Press, Oxford University Press, New York, 1995. x+475 pp. ISBN 0-19-853489-2 MR 1354144 1st edition. 1979.
- Macdonald, I. G. Symmetric Functions and Orthogonal Polynomials. Dean Jacqueline B. Lewis Memorial Lectures presented at Rutgers University, New Brunswick, New Jersey. University Lecture Series, 12. American Mathematical Society, Providence, Rhode Island, 1998. xvi+53 pp. ISBN 0-8218-0770-6 MR 1488699
- Atiyah, M. F.; Macdonald, I. G. Introduction to Commutative Algebra. Addison-Wesley Publishing Co., Reading, Mass.-London-Don Mills, Ont., 1969. ix+128 pp. ISBN 0-201-40751-5 MR 0242802; 1994 pbk edition

Preceded by Frank Adams	Fielden Chair of Pure Mathematics	Succeeded by Norman Blackburn
