= Ivan Cherednik =

Russian mathematician

- Born: December 3, 1951 (age 74); Moscow
- Education: Moscow State University, 1976; Steklov Institute of Mathematics, 1984
- Known for: Cherednik algebra
- Awards: Guggenheim Fellowship (1997); ICM Speaker (1998)
- Scientific career
- Fields: Mathematics
- Workplaces: University of North Carolina at Chapel Hill
- Doctoral advisor: Yuri Manin

Ivan Cherednik (Иван Владимирович Чередник) is a Russian-American mathematician. He introduced double affine Hecke algebras, and used them to prove Macdonald's constant term conjecture in (Cherednik 1995). He has also dealt with algebraic geometry, number theory and Soliton equations. His research interests include representation theory, mathematical physics, and algebraic combinatorics. He is currently the Austin M. Carr Distinguished Professor of mathematics at the University of North Carolina at Chapel Hill.

In 1998 he was an Invited Speaker of the International Congress of Mathematicians in Berlin.

== See also ==
- Dyson conjecture
- Macdonald polynomials
- Yangian

== Publications ==
- Cherednik, Ivan (1995), "Double Affine Hecke Algebras and Macdonald's Conjectures", Annals of Mathematics, Second Series, 141 (1), Annals of Mathematics: 191–216, doi:10.2307/2118632, ISSN 0003-486X, JSTOR 2118632
- Cherednik, Ivan (2005), Double affine Hecke algebras, London Mathematical Society Lecture Note Series, vol. 319, Cambridge University Press, ISBN 978-0-521-60918-0, MR 2133033
- Cherednik, Ivan (2023), Combinatorics, Modeling, Elementary Number Theory: From Basic to Advanced, World Scientific, 2023, ISBN 9811265402
