= Double affine Hecke algebra =

Algebra term in mathematics

In mathematics, a double affine Hecke algebra, or Cherednik algebra, is an algebra containing the Hecke algebra of an affine Weyl group, given as the quotient of the group ring of a double affine braid group. They were introduced by Cherednik, who used them to prove Macdonald's constant term conjecture for Macdonald polynomials. Infinitesimal Cherednik algebras have significant implications in representation theory, and therefore have important applications in particle physics and chemistry.
