= Affine Hecke algebra =

In mathematics, an affine Hecke algebra is the algebra associated to an affine Weyl group, and can be used to prove Macdonald's constant term conjecture for Macdonald polynomials.

== Definition ==
Let $V$ be a Euclidean space of a finite dimension and $\Sigma$ an affine root system on $V$. An affine Hecke algebra is a certain associative algebra that deforms the group algebra $\mathbb{C}[W]$ of the Weyl group $W$ of $\Sigma$ (the affine Weyl group). It is usually denoted by $H(\Sigma,q)$, where $q:\Sigma\rightarrow \mathbb{C}$ is multiplicity function that plays the role of deformation parameter. For $q\equiv 1$ the affine Hecke algebra $H(\Sigma,q)$ indeed reduces to $\mathbb{C}[W]$.

== Generalizations ==
Ivan Cherednik introduced generalizations of affine Hecke algebras, the so-called double affine Hecke algebra (usually referred to as DAHA). Using this he was able to give a proof of Macdonald's constant term conjecture for Macdonald polynomials (building on work of Eric Opdam). Another main inspiration for Cherednik to consider the double affine Hecke algebra was the quantum KZ equations.
