= Spherical variety =

In algebraic geometry, given a reductive algebraic group G and a Borel subgroup B, a spherical variety is a G-variety with an open dense B-orbit. It is sometimes also assumed to be normal. Examples are flag varieties, symmetric spaces and (affine or projective) toric varieties.

There is also a notion of real spherical varieties.

A projective spherical variety is a Mori dream space.

Spherical embeddings are classified by so-called colored fans, a generalization of fans for toric varieties; this is known as Luna-Vust Theory.

In his seminal paper, Luna (2001) developed a framework to classify complex spherical subgroups of reductive groups; he reduced the classification of spherical subgroups to wonderful subgroups. He further worked out the case of groups of type A and conjectured that combinatorial objects consisting of "homogeneous spherical data" classify spherical subgroups. This is known as the Luna Conjecture. This classification is now complete according to Luna's program; see contributions of Bravi, Cupit-Foutou, Losev and Pezzini.

As conjectured by Knop, every "smooth" affine spherical variety is uniquely determined by its weight monoid. This uniqueness result was proven by Losev.

Knop (2013) has been developing a program to classify spherical varieties in arbitrary characteristic.
