= Mark Haiman =

American mathematician

Mark David Haiman
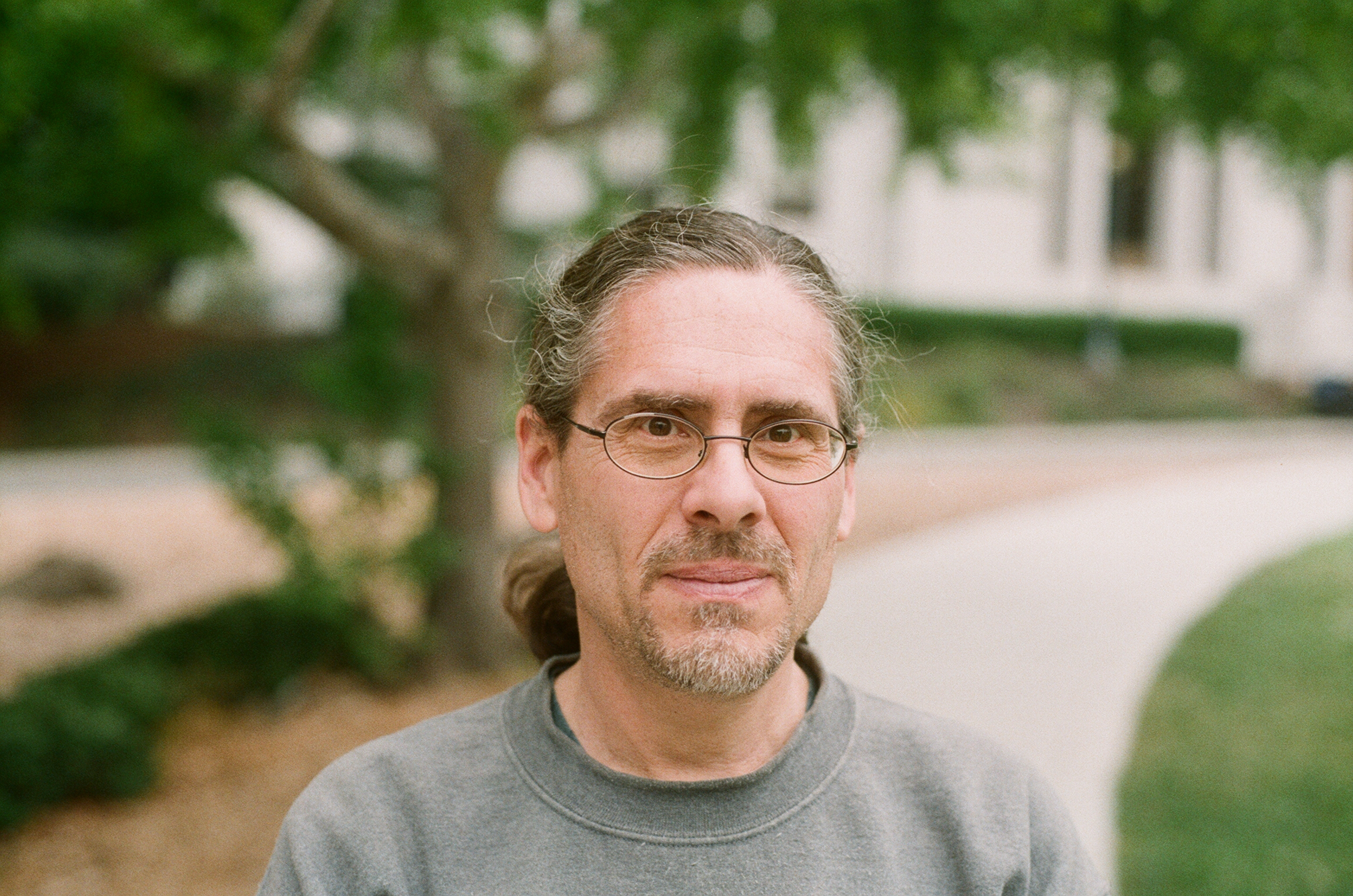
- Title: Professor of Mathematics
- Awards: E. H. Moore Research Article Prize

Academic background
- Education: Massachusetts Institute of Technology
- Thesis: The Theory of Linear Lattices (1984)
- Doctoral advisor: Gian-Carlo Rota

Academic work
- Institutions: University of California, San Diego 1991-2001; University of California, Berkeley 2001-present
- Doctoral students: Joseph Alfano; Sami Assaf; Sara Billey; Jonah Blasiak; William Brockman; Carol Chang; Maria Gillespie; David Herscovici; Sarah Iveson; Jeremy Martin; Jason Ribando; Foster Tom; Alexander Woo
- Main interests: Algebraic combinatorics
- Website: math.berkeley.edu/~mhaiman/

Mark David Haiman is a mathematician at the University of California at Berkeley who proved the Macdonald positivity conjecture for Macdonald polynomials. He received his Ph.D. in 1984 in the Massachusetts Institute of Technology under the direction of Gian-Carlo Rota. Previous to his appointment at Berkeley, he held positions at the University of California, San Diego and the Massachusetts Institute of Technology.

In 2004, he received the inaugural AMS Moore Prize. In 2012, he became a fellow of the American Mathematical Society.

== Selected publications ==
- Haiman, Mark (2001), "Hilbert schemes, polygraphs, and the Macdonald positivity conjecture", Journal of the American Mathematical Society, 14 (4): 941–1006, arXiv:math.AG/0010246, Bibcode:2000math.....10246H, doi:10.1090/S0894-0347-01-00373-3, S2CID 9253880
