= Affine root system =

The affine root system of type G_{2}.

In mathematics, an affine root system is a root system of affine-linear functions on a Euclidean space. They are used in the classification of affine Lie algebras and superalgebras, and semi-simple p-adic algebraic groups and correspond to families of Macdonald polynomials. The reduced affine root systems were used by Kac and Moody in their work on Kac–Moody algebras. Possibly non-reduced affine root systems were introduced and classified by Macdonald (1972) and Bruhat & Tits (1972) (except that both these papers accidentally omitted the Dynkin diagram).

== Definition ==
Let E be an affine space and V the vector space of its translations. Recall that V acts faithfully and transitively on E. In particular, if $u,v \in E$, then it is well defined an element in V denoted as $u-v$ which is the only element w such that $v+w=u$.

Now suppose we have a scalar product $(\cdot,\cdot)$ on V. This defines a metric on E as $d(u,v)=\vert(u-v,u-v)\vert$.

Consider the vector space F of affine-linear functions $f\colon E\longrightarrow \mathbb{R}$. Having fixed a $x_0\in E$, every element in F can be written as $f(x)=Df(x-x_0)+f(x_0)$ with $Df$ a linear function on V that doesn't depend on the choice of $x_0$.

Now the dual of V can be identified with V thanks to the chosen scalar product, and we can define a product on F as $(f,g)=(Df,Dg)$. Set $f^\vee =\frac{2f}{(f,f)}$ and $v^\vee =\frac{2v}{(v,v)}$ for any $f\in F$ and $v\in V$ respectively. The identification let us define a reflection $w_f$ over E in the following way:

$$w_f(x)=x-f^\vee(x)Df.$$

By transposition $w_f$ acts also on F as

$$w_f(g)=g-(f^\vee,g)f.$$

An affine root system is a subset $S\subset F$ such that:

1. S spans F and its elements are non-constant.
2. $w_a(S)=S$ for every $a\in S$.
3. $(a,b^\vee)\in\mathbb{Z}$ for every $a,b\in S$.

The elements of S are called affine roots. Denote with $w(S)$ the group generated by the $w_a$ with $a\in S$. We also ask

4. $w(S)$ as a discrete group acts properly on E.

This means that for any two compacts $K,H\subseteq E$ the elements of $w(S)$ such that $w(K)\cap H\neq \varnothing$ are a finite number.

== Classification ==
The affine roots systems A_{1} = B_{1} = B^{∨}_{1} = C_{1} = C^{∨}_{1} are the same, as are the pairs B_{2} = C_{2}, B^{∨}_{2} = C^{∨}_{2}, and A_{3} = D_{3}.

The number of orbits given in the table is the number of orbits of simple roots under the Weyl group. In the Dynkin diagrams, the non-reduced simple roots α (with 2α a root) are colored green. The first Dynkin diagram in a series sometimes does not follow the same rule as the others.

Affine root system	Number of orbits	Dynkin diagram
A_{n} (n ≥ 1)	2 if n=1, 1 if n≥2	,,,, ...
B_{n} (n ≥ 3)	2	,,, ...
B^{∨}_{n} (n ≥ 3)	2	,,, ...
C_{n} (n ≥ 2)	3	,,, ...
C^{∨}_{n} (n ≥ 2)	3	,,, ...
BC_{n} (n ≥ 1)	2 if n=1, 3 if n ≥ 2	,,,, ...
D_{n} (n ≥ 4)	1	,,, ...
E_{6}	1	
E_{7}	1	
E_{8}	1	
F_{4}	2	
F^{∨}_{4}	2	
G_{2}	2	
G^{∨}_{2}	2	
(BC_{n}, C_{n}) (n ≥ 1)	3 if n=1, 4 if n≥2	,,,, ...
(C^{∨}_{n}, BC_{n}) (n ≥ 1)	3 if n=1, 4 if n≥2	,,,, ...
(B_{n}, B^{∨}_{n}) (n ≥ 2)	4 if n=2, 3 if n≥3	,,,, ...
(C^{∨}_{n}, C_{n}) (n ≥ 1)	4 if n=1, 5 if n≥2	,,,, ...

=== Irreducible affine root systems by rank ===
Rank 1: A_{1}, BC_{1}, (BC_{1}, C_{1}), (C^{∨}_{1}, BC_{1}), (C^{∨}_{1}, C_{1}).
Rank 2: A_{2}, C_{2}, C^{∨}_{2}, BC_{2}, (BC_{2}, C_{2}), (C^{∨}_{2}, BC_{2}), (B_{2}, B^{∨}_{2}), (C^{∨}_{2}, C_{2}), G_{2}, G^{∨}_{2}.
Rank 3: A_{3}, B_{3}, B^{∨}_{3}, C_{3}, C^{∨}_{3}, BC_{3}, (BC_{3}, C_{3}), (C^{∨}_{3}, BC_{3}), (B_{3}, B^{∨}_{3}), (C^{∨}_{3}, C_{3}).
Rank 4: A_{4}, B_{4}, B^{∨}_{4}, C_{4}, C^{∨}_{4}, BC_{4}, (BC_{4}, C_{4}), (C^{∨}_{4}, BC_{4}), (B_{4}, B^{∨}_{4}), (C^{∨}_{4}, C_{4}), D_{4}, F_{4}, F^{∨}_{4}.
Rank 5: A_{5}, B_{5}, B^{∨}_{5}, C_{5}, C^{∨}_{5}, BC_{5}, (BC_{5}, C_{5}), (C^{∨}_{5}, BC_{5}), (B_{5}, B^{∨}_{5}), (C^{∨}_{5}, C_{5}), D_{5}.
Rank 6: A_{6}, B_{6}, B^{∨}_{6}, C_{6}, C^{∨}_{6}, BC_{6}, (BC_{6}, C_{6}), (C^{∨}_{6}, BC_{6}), (B_{6}, B^{∨}_{6}), (C^{∨}_{6}, C_{6}), D_{6}, E_{6},
Rank 7: A_{7}, B_{7}, B^{∨}_{7}, C_{7}, C^{∨}_{7}, BC_{7}, (BC_{7}, C_{7}), (C^{∨}_{7}, BC_{7}), (B_{7}, B^{∨}_{7}), (C^{∨}_{7}, C_{7}), D_{7}, E_{7},
Rank 8: A_{8}, B_{8}, B^{∨}_{8}, C_{8}, C^{∨}_{8}, BC_{8}, (BC_{8}, C_{8}), (C^{∨}_{8}, BC_{8}), (B_{8}, B^{∨}_{8}), (C^{∨}_{8}, C_{8}), D_{8}, E_{8},
Rank n (n>8): A_{n}, B_{n}, B^{∨}_{n}, C_{n}, C^{∨}_{n}, BC_{n}, (BC_{n}, C_{n}), (C^{∨}_{n}, BC_{n}), (B_{n}, B^{∨}_{n}), (C^{∨}_{n}, C_{n}), D_{n}.

== Applications ==
- Macdonald (1972) showed that the affine root systems index Macdonald identities
- Bruhat & Tits (1972) used affine root systems to study p-adic algebraic groups.
- Reduced affine root systems classify affine Kac–Moody algebras, while the non-reduced affine root systems correspond to affine Lie superalgebras.
- Macdonald (2003) showed that affine roots systems index families of Macdonald polynomials.
