= Hilbert's fifteenth problem =

On Schubert's enumerative calculus

Hilbert's fifteenth problem is one of the 23 Hilbert problems set out in a list compiled in 1900 by David Hilbert. The problem is to put Schubert's enumerative calculus on a rigorous foundation.

== Introduction ==
Schubert calculus is the intersection theory of the 19th century, together with applications to enumerative geometry. Justifying this calculus was the content of Hilbert's 15th problem, and was also the major topic of the 20 century algebraic geometry. In the course of securing the foundations of intersection theory, Van der Waerden and André Weil related the problem to the determination of the cohomology ring H*(G/P) of a flag manifold G/P, where G is a Lie group and P a parabolic subgroup of G.

The additive structure of the ring H*(G/P) is given by the basis theorem of Schubert calculus due to Ehresmann, Chevalley, and Bernstein-Gel'fand-Gel'fand, stating that the classical Schubert classes on G/P form a free basis of the cohomology ring H*(G/P). The remaining problem of expanding products of Schubert classes as linear combinations of basis elements was called the characteristic problem by Schubert, and regarded by him as "the main theoretic problem of enumerative geometry".

While enumerative geometry made no connection with physics during the first century of its development, it has since emerged as a central element of string theory.

== Problem statement ==
The entirety of the original problem statement, in English translation, is as follows:

The problem consists in this: To establish rigorously and with an exact determination of the limits of their validity those geometrical numbers which Schubert especially has determined on the basis of the so-called principle of special position, or conservation of number, by means of the enumerative calculus developed by him.

Although the algebra of today guarantees, in principle, the possibility of carrying out the processes of elimination, yet for the proof of the theorems of enumerative geometry decidedly more is requisite, namely, the actual carrying out of the process of elimination in the case of equations of special form in such a way that the degree of the final equations and the multiplicity of their solutions may be foreseen.

== Schubert calculus ==
Schubert calculus is a branch of algebraic geometry introduced in the nineteenth century by Hermann Schubert to solve various counting problems of projective geometry (part of enumerative geometry). It was a precursor of several more modern theories, for example characteristic classes, and in particular its algorithmic aspects are still of interest.

The objects introduced by Schubert are the Schubert cells, which are locally closed sets in a Grassmannian defined by conditions of incidence of a linear subspace in projective space with a given flag. For details see Schubert variety.

According to Van der Waerden, and André Weil, Hilbert problem fifteen had been solved. In particular cases:

- Schubert's characteristic problem has been solved by Haibao Duan and Xuezhi Zhao;
- Special presentations of the Chow rings of flag manifolds have been worked out by Borel, Marlin, Billey-Haiman and Duan-Zhao, et al.;
- Major enumerative examples of Schubert have been verified by Aluffi, Harris, Kleiman, Xambó, et al.
