= Sara Billey =

American mathematician (born 1968)

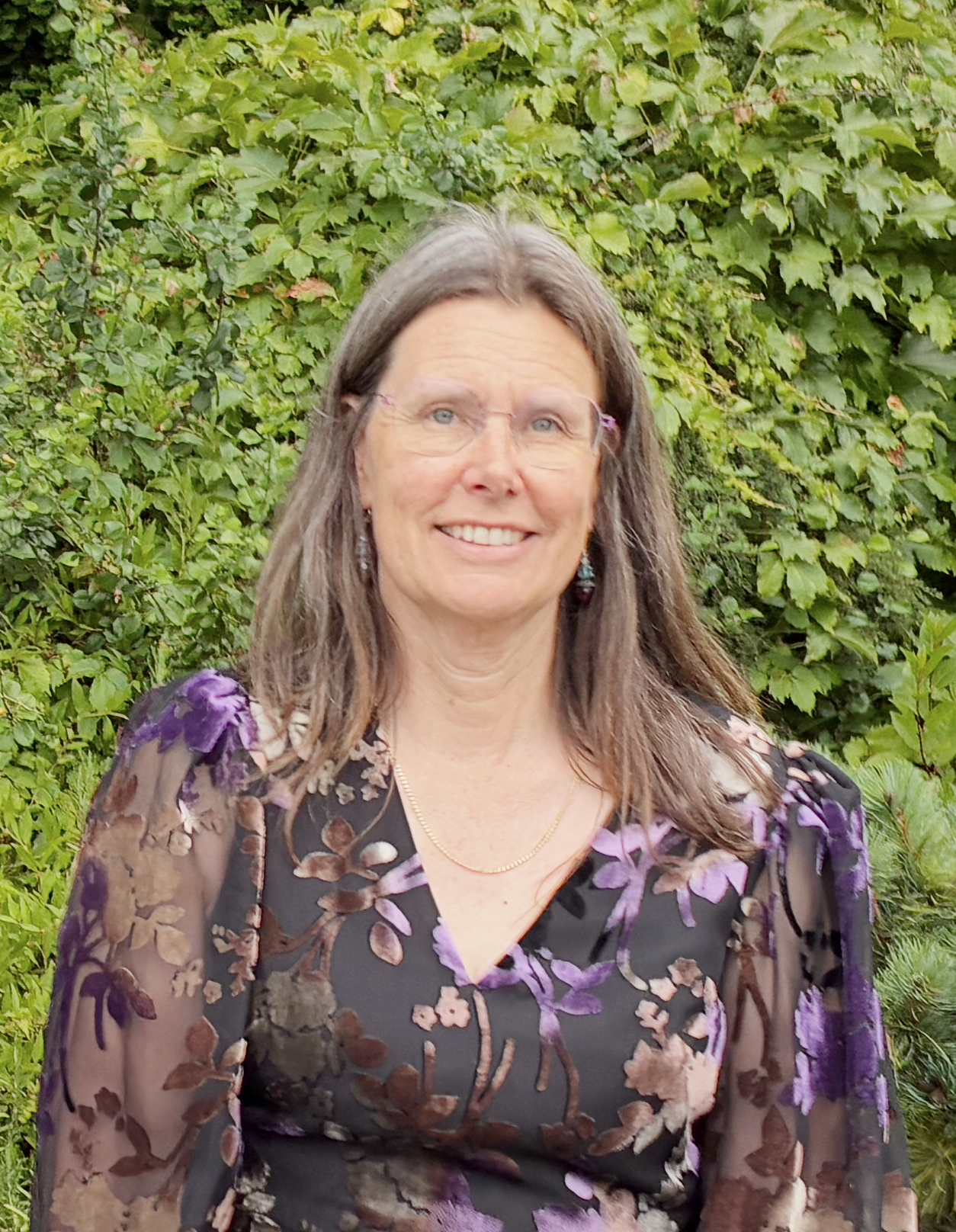
- Billey in 2026
- Education: Massachusetts Institute of Technology; University of California, San Diego
- Scientific career
- Fields: Mathematics
- Institutions: University of Washington
- Doctoral advisor: Adriano Garsia; Mark Haiman

Sara Cosette Billey is an American mathematician working in algebraic combinatorics. She is known for her contributions on Schubert polynomials, singular loci of Schubert varieties, Kostant polynomials, and Kazhdan–Lusztig polynomials often using computer verified proofs. She is currently a professor of mathematics at the University of Washington.

== Education and career ==
Billey did her undergraduate studies at the Massachusetts Institute of Technology, graduating in 1990. She earned her Ph.D. in mathematics in 1994 from the University of California, San Diego, under the joint supervision of Adriano Garsia and Mark Haiman. She returned to MIT as a postdoctoral researcher with Richard P. Stanley, and continued there as an assistant and associate professor until 2003, when she moved to the University of Washington.

== Recognition ==
In 2000, Billey received the Presidential Early Career Award for Scientists and Engineers, the highest honor given by the United States government to mathematicians, scientists, and engineers near the start of their independent research careers. Billey became a fellow of the American Mathematical Society in 2012, in the inaugural class.

== Selected publications ==
=== Books ===
- Sara, Billey; Lakshmibai, V. (2000). Singular loci of Schubert varieties. Boston: Birkhäuser. ISBN 9780817640927. OCLC 44750779.

=== Articles ===
- Billey, Sara; Haiman, Mark (1995). "Schubert polynomials for the classical groups". Journal of the American Mathematical Society. 8 (2): 443–482. doi:10.1090/s0894-0347-1995-1290232-1. ISSN 0894-0347.
- Billey, Sara; Warrington, Gregory (2003). "Maximal singular loci of Schubert varieties in 𝑆𝐿(𝑛)/𝐵". Transactions of the American Mathematical Society. 355 (10): 3915–3945. doi:10.1090/s0002-9947-03-03019-8. ISSN 0002-9947.
- Billey, Sara (1999). "Kostant polynomials and the cohomology ring for G/B". Duke Mathematical Journal. 96 (1): 205–224. doi:10.1215/S0012-7094-99-09606-0. ISSN 0012-7094. S2CID 16184223.
