= Ravi Vakil =

Canadian-American mathematician

Ravi Damodar Vakil
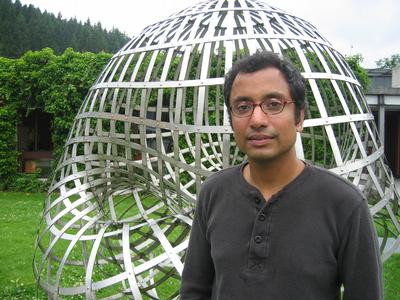
- Vakil in 2008
- Born: February 22, 1970 (age 56); Etobicoke, Ontario, Canada
- Education: University of Toronto (BSc, MSc); Harvard University (PhD)
- Awards: Chauvenet Prize (2014)
- Scientific career
- Fields: Mathematics
- Workplaces: Stanford University; MIT; Princeton University
- Doctoral advisor: Joe Harris

Ravi D. Vakil (born February 22, 1970) is a Canadian-American mathematician working in algebraic geometry. He is the current president of the American Mathematical Society.

== Education and career ==
Vakil was born on February 22, 1970. His father was a professor of preventative medicine at the University of Toronto and his mother was a high school math teacher. He later attended high school at Martingrove Collegiate Institute in Etobicoke, Ontario, where he won several mathematical contests and olympiads. After earning a BSc and MSc from the University of Toronto in 1992, he completed a PhD in mathematics at Harvard University in 1997 under Joe Harris. He has since been an instructor at both Princeton University and MIT. Since the fall of 2001, he has taught at Stanford University, becoming a full professor in 2007. The Rising Sea: Foundations of Algebraic Geometry, a mathematical textbook about algebraic geometry by Ravi Vakil, was published in 2025, although drafts were available online ever since he began to write it in 2010.

== Contributions ==
Vakil is an algebraic geometer and his research work spans over enumerative geometry, topology, Gromov–Witten theory, and classical algebraic geometry. He has solved several old problems in Schubert calculus. Among other results, he proved that all Schubert problems are enumerative over the real numbers, a result that resolves an issue mathematicians have worked on for at least two decades.

== Awards and honors ==
Vakil has received many awards, including an NSF CAREER Fellowship, a Sloan Research Fellowship, an American Mathematical Society Centennial Fellowship, a G. de B. Robinson prize for the best paper published (2000) in the Canadian Journal of Mathematics and the Canadian Mathematical Bulletin, and the André-Aisenstadt Prize from the Centre de Recherches Mathématiques at the Université de Montréal (2005), and the Chauvenet Prize (2014).

In 2013 he became a fellow of the American Mathematical Society. Vakil was elected as its president in 2024 and began his two-year term on 1 February 2025.

== Mathematics contests ==
He was a member of the Canadian team in three International Mathematical Olympiads, winning silver, gold (perfect score), and gold in 1986, 1987, and 1988 respectively. He was also the fourth person to be a four-time Putnam Fellow in the history of the contest. Also, he has been the coordinator of weekly Putnam preparation seminars at Stanford.
