= Steiner's problem =

In mathematics, Steiner's problem (named after Jakob Steiner) may refer to:

- Steiner's calculus problem
- The Steiner tree problem
- Steiner's conic problem
