= Giambelli =

Giambelli is an Italian surname. Notable people with the surname include:

- Federigo Giambelli, Italian military and civil engineer
- Giovanni Giambelli (1879–1935), Italian mathematician
- Miguel Maria Giambelli (1920–2010), Brazilian Roman Catholic bishop
- Valentino Giambelli (1928–2019), Italian footballer and businessman
