= Vladimir Retakh =

Russian-American mathematician

- Born: May 20, 1948; Chișinău, Soviet Union
- Education: Moscow State V. I. Lenin Pedagogical Institute
- Known for: Quasideterminant and Noncommutative symmetric function
- Scientific career
- Fields: Mathematics
- Workplaces: Rutgers University
- Doctoral advisors: Dmitrii Abramovich Raikov

Vladimir Solomonovich Retakh (Russian: Ретах Владимир Соломонович; 20 May 1948) is a Russian-American mathematician who made important contributions to Noncommutative algebra and combinatorics among other areas.

== Biography ==
Retakh graduated in 1970 from the Moscow State Pedagogical University. Beginning as an undergraduate Retakh regularly attended lectures and seminars at the Moscow State University most notably the Gelfand seminars. He obtained his PhD in 1973 under the mentorship of Dmitrii Abramovich Raikov. He joined the Gelfand group in 1986.

His first position was at the central Research Institute for Engineering Buildings and later obtained his first academic position at the Council for Cybernetics of the Soviet Academy of Sciences in 1989. While at the Council for Cybernetics of the Soviet Academy of Sciences in 1990, Retakh had started working with Gelfand on their new program on Noncommutative determinants. Prior to immigrating to the US in 1993 he also held a position at the Scientific Research Institute of System Development

== Research ==
Retakh's other contributions include:

- Contributions to the theory of general hypergeometric functions
- Contributions to the theory of Lie–Massey operators
- Instigated the study of homotopical properties of categories of extensions based on the Retakh isomorphism
- Introduction of noncommutative determinants, also known as quasideterminants
- Introduction of noncommutative symmetric functions
- The introduction of noncommutative Plücker coordinates
- Noncommutative integrable systems

== Recognition ==
He was included in the 2019 class of fellows of the American Mathematical Society "for contributions to noncommutative algebra and noncommutative algebraic geometry".
