= Dan Laksov =

Norwegian-Swedish mathematician and human rights activist

- Born: 10 July 1940; Oslo, Norway
- Died: 25 October 2013 (aged 73); Stockholm, Sweden
- Education: University of Bergen; Massachusetts Institute of Technology
- Known for: Professor of Mathematics at the KTH Royal Institute of Technology in Stockholm

Dan Laksov (10 July 1940 – 25 October 2013) was a Norwegian-Swedish mathematician and human rights activist. He was primarily active within the field of algebraic geometry.

== Biography ==
Laksov was born in Oslo in 1940, the same year that Norway was occupied by Nazi Germany. He was a son of Amalie Laksov (née Scheer) and Håkon Laksov (ne Laks), both born 1911; the family were Jews. The ancestors on both sides had immigrated from Russia via the Baltics to Norway in the late 19th century. Håkon Laksov was a lawyer and active in the Jewish community. In the book I slik en natt. Historien om deportasjonen av jøder fra Norge by Kristian Ottosen, the escape of Amalie and Dan from Norway in November 1942 is chronicled. Håkon and Amalie's four brothers were all captured in October 1942 as a part of the arresting of all Norwegian Jews, shipped on SS Donau to Auschwitz in November 1942 and perished there sometime in early 1943. Amalie had been tipped off ahead of the next wave of arrests and managed to hide together with her young son at various addresses in Oslo before being able to flee to Sweden, where they reunited with Amalie's mother and two aunts and spent the rest of the war in Norrköping. The family's apartment was usurped by the family of a leading Young Nazi leader, Bjørn Østring, but retrieved after the war. In 1945 Dan returned to Oslo where he lived with his grandparents, while Amalie commuted to Bergen.

After finishing secondary school, he studied one year at a commercial high school before entering University of Bergen in 1960 where he studied mathematics. He graduated in 1964 and after one year of non-armed conscription service, he travelled to Paris on a scholarship to study at Institut Henri Poincaré. In Paris he encountered Steven Kleiman and in 1967 Laksov became one of Kleiman's Ph.D. students at Columbia University, and when Kleiman moved to Massachusetts Institute of Technology (MIT) in 1968 Laksov followed him. Laksov took his Ph.D. from MIT in 1972 and wrote a thesis with the title The Structure of Schubert Schemes and Schubert Cycles. He remained one year at MIT as a postdoc. During the next couple of years he mostly alternated between Oslo and Stockholm. 1978–1981 he was head of algebraic geometry at the Mittag-Leffler Institute in Stockholm. 1981–1984 he was a senior lecturer at the Stockholm University and 1984–1986 he was professor of mathematics at Uppsala University.

From 1986 to his retirement he was professor of mathematics at the Royal Institute of Technology in Stockholm . He also served as a director of the Mittag-Leffler Institute during the period 1986–1994 and was editor of the institute's journal Acta Mathematica. His main contributions were in algebra, algebraic geometry and Schubert calculus. He was a foreign member of the Royal Swedish Academy of Sciences and a fellow of the Norwegian Academy of Science and Letters. In 2008 he received an honorary degree at the University of Bergen.

In 1983, his mother Amalie Laksov created a foundation for human rights, Amalie Laksovs Minnefond. Dan Laksov was a board member, and member of the committee that awarded the Laksov Prize for human rights. Amalie Laksov died in 2008, aged 97, while Dan Laksov died in Stockholm in October 2013.
