= S-function =

In mathematics, S-function may refer to:

- sigmoid function
- Schur polynomials
- A function in the Laplace transformed 's-domain'

In computer science,

- It may be member of a series of graph parameters, see Treewidth § Hadwiger number and S-functions

In physics, it may refer to:

- action functional

In MATLAB, it may refer to:

- A type of dynamically linked subroutine for Simulink.
