= Helfand =

Helfand is a surname meaning "helper" in Yiddish. Notable people with the surname include:

- David Helfand, American astronomer
- Jessica Helfand, designer, author, and educator
- Lev Borisovich Helfand, Soviet diplomat

== See also ==
- Gelfand
- Gelfond
- Helfant
