= Monk's formula =

In mathematics, Monk's formula, found by Monk (1959), is an analogue of Pieri's formula that describes the product of a linear Schubert polynomial by a Schubert polynomial. Equivalently, it describes the product of a special Schubert cycle by a Schubert cycle in the cohomology of a flag manifold.

Write t_{ij} for the transposition (i j), and s_{i} = t_{i,i+1}. Then 𝔖_{s_{r}} = x_{1} + ⋯ + x_{r}, and Monk's formula states that for a permutation w,

$\mathfrak{S}_{s_r} \mathfrak{S}_w = \sum_{{i \leq r < j} \atop {\ell(wt_{ij}) = \ell(w)+1}} \mathfrak{S}_{wt_{ij}},$

where $\ell(w)$ is the length of w. The pairs (i, j) appearing in the sum are exactly those such that i ≤ r < j, w_{i} < w_{j}, and there is no i < k < j with w_{i} < w_{k} < w_{j}; each wt_{ij} is a cover of w in Bruhat order.
