= Pieri's formula =

Mathematical formula

In mathematics, Pieri's formula, named after Mario Pieri, describes the product of a Schubert cycle by a special Schubert cycle in the Schubert calculus, or the product of a Schur polynomial by a complete symmetric function.

In terms of Schur functions s_{λ} indexed by partitions λ, it states that

$$\displaystyle s_\mu h_r=\sum_\lambda s_\lambda$$

where h_{r} is a complete homogeneous symmetric polynomial and the sum is over all partitions λ obtained from μ by adding r elements, no two in the same column. By applying the ω involution on the ring of symmetric functions, one obtains the dual Pieri rule for multiplying an elementary symmetric polynomial with a Schur polynomial:

$$\displaystyle s_\mu e_r=\sum_\lambda s_\lambda$$

The sum is now taken over all partitions λ obtained from μ by adding r elements, no two in the same row.

Pieri's formula implies Giambelli's formula. The Littlewood–Richardson rule is a generalization of Pieri's formula giving the product of any two Schur functions. Monk's formula is an analogue of Pieri's formula for flag manifolds.
