= Susan Jane Colley =

American mathematician

- Born: Susan Morris; 1959 (age 66–67)
- Education: Massachusetts Institute of Technology
- Occupation: Mathematician
- Scientific career
- Workplaces: Oberlin College

Susan Jane Colley (née Morris, born 1959) is an American mathematician. She was a professor of mathematics at Oberlin College from 1983 to 2025 before taking emeritus status. She served as the named professorship of Andrew and Pauline Delaney Professor of Mathematics from 1999 to 2025. She is a former editor-in-chief of the American Mathematical Monthly.

== Biography ==
Colley went to the Massachusetts Institute of Technology (MIT) as an undergraduate, and earned her Ph.D. at MIT in 1983. Her dissertation, On the Enumerative Geometry of Stationary Multiple-points, was supervised by Steven Kleiman.

Colley joined the faculty of Oberlin College in 1983 as an assistant professor. She was promoted to professor in 1995 and chaired the Department of Mathematics at Oberlin from 1994—1997 and again from 2011—2014. She was appointed the Andrew and Pauline Delaney Professor of Mathematics in 1999 and held that position for 26 years.

Colley was on the board of editors of the Mathematical Association of America (MAA) publication The College Mathematics Journal from 2010 –2018. She served on the board of editors of the MAA publication Focus from 2011–2015. She became editor of the American Mathematical Monthly beginning in 2017; she was the first woman to hold this position.

== Research ==
Colley's main research interests are algebraic geometry and related areas, particularly enumerative geometry, and intersection theory.

== Works ==
Colley authored textbooks intended for college undergraduates on the topics of vector calculus and linear algebra.

- Colley, Susan (1997), Vector Calculus, Prentice Hall (1st edition 1997, 2nd edition 2002, 3rd edition 2006, 4th edition 2011; Spanish language edition in 2013 as Cálculo vectorial; later editions published by Pearson)
