= Caporaso =

Caporaso is an Italian surname. Notable people with the surname include:

- Elena Gatti Caporaso (1918–1999), Italian socialist politician and feminist
- Lucia Caporaso (born 1965), Italian mathematician
- Luciana (singer) (born as Luciana Caporaso, 1973), English singer
- Teodorico Caporaso (born 1987), Italian racewalker
