= Ian R. Porteous =

Scottish mathematician and educator (1930 to 2011)

- Born: 9 October 1930
- Died: 30 January 2011 (aged 80)
- Education: University of Cambridge
- Scientific career
- Fields: Mathematics
- Workplaces: University of Liverpool
- Doctoral advisor: W. V. D. Hodge; Michael Atiyah

Ian Robertson Porteous (9 October 1930 – 30 January 2011) was a Scottish mathematician at the University of Liverpool and an educator on Merseyside. He is best known for three books on geometry and modern algebra. In Liverpool he and Peter Giblin are known for their registered charity Mathematical Education on Merseyside which promotes enthusiasm for mathematics through sponsorship of an annual competition.

== Family and early life ==
Porteous was born on 9 October 1930. He was one of six children of Reverend Norman Walker Porteous (later a theologian and Old Testament academic), from Crossgates, Fife and May Hadwen Robertson of Kirkcaldy, Fife. He attended George Watson's College in Edinburgh, and the University of Edinburgh, obtaining his first mathematical degree in 1952. After a time in national service, he took up study at Trinity College, Cambridge. Porteous wrote his thesis Algebraic Geometry under W.V.D. Hodge and Michael Atiyah at University of Cambridge in 1961.

== Early career ==
Porteous began teaching at the University of Liverpool as a lecturer in 1959, becoming senior lecturer in 1972. During a year (1961–62) at Columbia University in New York, Porteous was influenced by Serge Lang. He continued to do research on manifolds in differential geometry. In 1971 his article "The normal singularities of a submanifold" was published in Journal of Differential Geometry 5:543–64. It was concerned with the smooth embeddings of an m-manifold in R^{n}.

In 1969 Porteous published Topological Geometry with Van Nostrand Reinhold and Company. It was reviewed in Mathematical Reviews by J. Eells, who interpreted it as a three-term textbook for a sequence in abstract algebra, geometric algebra, and differential calculus in Euclidean and Banach spaces and on manifolds. Eells says "Surely this book is the product of substantial thought and care, both from the standpoints of consistent mathematical presentation and of student's pedagogical requirements." In 1981 a second edition was published with Cambridge University Press.

== Later career and works ==
In 1995 Ian Porteous published Clifford Algebras and the Classical Groups which was reviewed by Peter R. Law. In praise, Law says "Porteous' presentation of the subject matter sets a standard by which others may be judged." The book has 24 chapters including 8:Quaternions, 13: Classical groups, 15:Clifford algebras, 16:Spin groups, 17:Conjugation, 20:Topological spaces, 21:Manifolds, 22:Lie groups. In the preface Porteous acknowledges the contribution of his master's degree student Tony Hampson and anticipatory work by Terry Wall. See references to a link where misprints may be found.

The textbook Geometric Differentiation (1994) is a modern, elementary study of differential geometry. The subtitle, "for the intelligence of curves and surfaces" indicates its extent in the differential geometry of curves and differential geometry of surfaces. The review by D.R.J. Chillingworth says it is "aimed at advanced undergraduates or beginning graduate students in mathematics..." Chillingworth notes "a peculiar feature of the book is its use of compact notation for differentiation using numerical subscripts that allow tidy presentation of calculations." For instance, Porteous gives Faa di Bruno's formula. Furthermore, the reviewer notes that this mathematics has "connections to optics, kinematics and architecture as well as (more recently) geology, tomography, computer vision and face-recognition." These applications follow from the theories of contact, umbilical points, ridges, germs, and cusps. Porteous has suggestions for readers wanting to know more about singularity theory. The underlying theme is the study of critical points of appropriate distance-squared functions. A second edition was published in 2001, where the author was able to report on related work by Vladimir Arnold on spherical curves. In fact, Porteous had translated Arnold's paper from the Russian.

== Death and legacy ==
Porteous' commitment to mathematics education can be seen through the work of his charity "Mathematical Education on Merseyside" (see references). As recounted in the book Challenging Mathematics, in 1978 Giblin and Porteous began to organise a Challenge competition for first and second formers in secondary school. By 1989 they were drawing 3,500 participants each year. The competition was held over two weekends in the Spring Term. Students considered six questions in each round. Marking was arranged through the mathematics department of Liverpool University, and prizes were awarded at "an evening of mathematical recreation". Broad participation was encouraged by making half the problems widely accessible. Solutions to the problems appear in their book.

Beyond mathematics, Porteous enjoyed hill-walking and sang in his church choir. He served as a Liberal councillor on Liverpool City Council from 1974 to 1978.

He died suddenly of a suspected heart attack on 30 January 2011.

== Selected publications ==
- Porteous, Ian R. (1981), Topological Geometry (2nd ed.), Cambridge University Press, p. 486, ISBN 0-521-23160-4
- Porteous, Ian R. (1995), Clifford Algebras and the Classical Groups, Cambridge Studies in Advanced Mathematics, vol. 50, Cambridge University Press, ISBN 978-0-521-55177-9
- Porteous, Ian R. (2001), Geometric Differentiation, For the Intelligence of Curves and Surfaces (2nd ed.), Cambridge University Press, p. 350, ISBN 978-0-521-00264-6
- Giblin, P.J.; Porteus, I. R. (1990), Challenging Mathematics, Oxford University Press, ISBN 0-19-914361-7
- Vladimir Arnold (1995) "The geometry of spherical curves and the algebra of quaternions", translated by Ian Porteous, Russian Mathematical Surveys 50:1–68.

== See also ==
- Porteous formula
