= Helfant =

Helfant is a surname meaning "elephant" in the Yiddish language. Notable people with the surname include:

- Adam Helfant, sports executive
- Edwin Helfant (1926–1978), American lawyer

== See also ==
- Gelfond
- Gelfand
- Helfand
