= Gelfond =

Gelfond is a surname meaning "elephant" in the Yiddish language. Notable people with the surname include:

- Alexander Gelfond (1906–1968), Soviet mathematician
- Michael Gelfond, American computer scientist

== See also ==
- Gelfand
- Helfand
- Helfant
