= Sonia Moore =

American acting teacher (1902–1995)

- Born: December 9, 1902; Gomel, Russian Empire (now Belarus)
- Died: May 19, 1995 (aged 94); Manhattan, New York, U.S.
- Occupations: Acting teacher, actress
- Spouse: Lev Borisovich Helfand

Sofia Ezarovna Shatsova Helfand (née Russian: Софья Евзаровна Шацова /Sofja Evzarovna Shacova; December 9, 1902 – May 19, 1995), known as Sonia Moore, was a Russian-born American actress, writer and acting teacher. She is known for simplifying Stanislavski's system of acting devised by Konstantin Stanislavski. Moore was a student of Yevgeny Vakhtangov, and later became an acting teacher, founding her own school in New York City, the Sonia Moore Studio of the Theatre, in 1961.

== Early life ==
Sofia Ezarovna Shatsova was born in Gomel, Russian Empire (now Belarus) in 1902, into a Jewish family. She went to the Moscow Art Theatre School's Third Studio to study acting under Russian theatre practitioner Yevgeny Vakhtangov in 1920. She married Soviet diplomat Lev Borisovich Helfand in Paris in 1926. They had a daughter, Irene, born in Paris, France, in 1928. In 1940, she and her husband defected from his posting in Italy to the United States, fearing Stalin's purges if he were to return to Moscow. They adopted the surname Moore, and she became Sonia Moore.

After her husband's death in 1957, Sonia decided to open a school of acting to bring the updated and revised teachings of Stanislavski to America. In 1961, she founded the Sonia Moore Studio of the Theatre in New York City.

== Contribution to Stanislavsky acting system ==
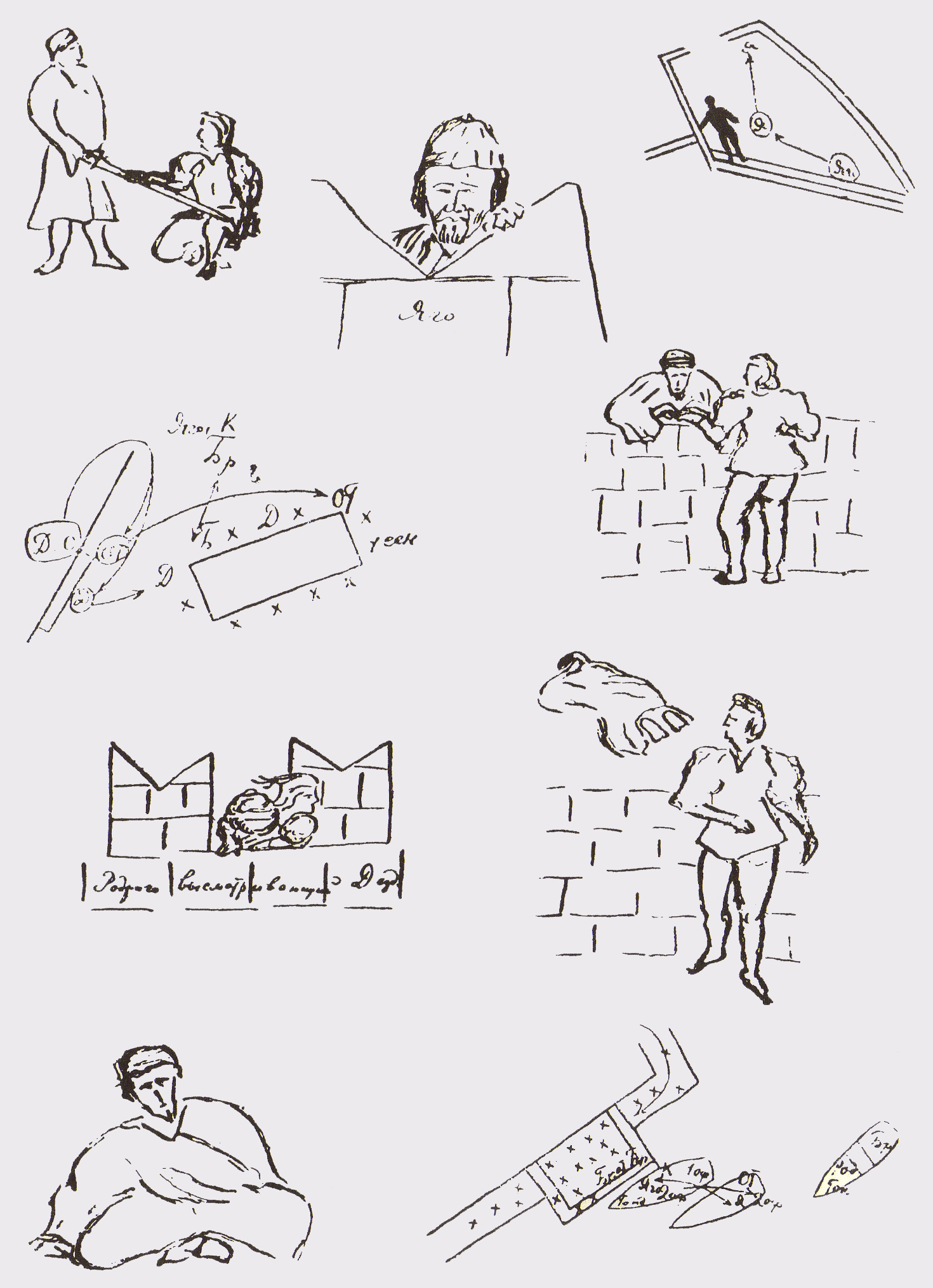
Sketches by Stanislavski in his 1929—1930 production plan for Othello, which offers the first exposition of what came to be known as his Method of Physical Action rehearsal process, which was simplified by Sonia Moore

In 1960 her book The Stanislavski Method was published. Her intention was to clarify the many misunderstandings and distortions surrounding on Stanislavski's theories, which occurred during the development of "method acting". The book was later revised and republished under the title The Stanislavski System. She also simplified the method of simple physical action.

== Works ==
- The Stanislavski System: The Professional Training of an Actor (1965).
- The Stanislavski System: The Professional Training of an Actor; Second Revised Edition (1984).
- Training an Actor: The Stanislavski System in Class (1997).
- Stanislavski Revealed: The Actor's Complete Guide to Spontaneity on Stage (republished 2000).

== See also ==
- Michael Chekhov
- Uta Hagen
- Estelle Harman
- Robert Lewis
- Lee Strasberg
- Sanford Meisner
