= Hopf algebra of permutations =

In algebra, the Malvenuto–Poirier–Reutenauer Hopf algebra of permutations or MPR Hopf algebra is a Hopf algebra with a basis of all elements of all the finite symmetric groups S_{n}, and is a non-commutative analogue of the Hopf algebra of symmetric functions. It is both free as an algebra and graded-cofree as a graded coalgebra, so is in some sense as far as possible from being either commutative or cocommutative. It was introduced by Malvenuto & Reutenauer (1995) and studied by Poirier & Reutenauer (1995).

== Definition ==
The underlying free abelian group of the MPR algebra has a basis consisting of the disjoint union of the symmetric groups S_{n} for n = 0, 1, 2, .... , which can be thought of as permutations.

The identity 1 is the empty permutation, and the counit takes the empty permutation to 1 and the others to 0.

The product of two permutations (a_{1},...,a_{m}) and (b_{1},...,b_{n}) in MPR is given by the shuffle product (a_{1},...,a_{m}) ш (m + b_{1},...,m + b_{n}).

The coproduct of a permutation a on m points is given by Σ_{a=b*c} st(b) ⊗ st(c), where the sum is over the m + 1 ways to write a (considered as a sequence of m integers) as a concatenation of two sequences b and c, and st(b) is the standardization of b, where the elements of the sequence b are reduced to be a set of the form {1, 2, ..., n} while preserving their order.

The antipode has infinite order.

== Relation to other algebras ==
The Hopf algebra of permutations relates the rings of symmetric functions, quasisymmetric functions, and noncommutative symmetric functions, (denoted Sym, QSym, and NSym respectively), as depicted in the following commutative diagram. The duality between QSym and NSym is shown in the main diagonal of this diagram.

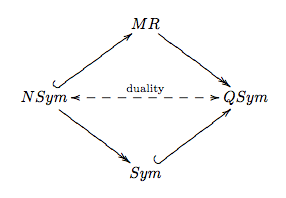
