= Schubert polynomial =

In mathematics, Schubert polynomials are generalizations of Schur polynomials that represent cohomology classes of Schubert cycles in flag varieties. They were introduced by Lascoux & Schützenberger (1982) and are named after Hermann Schubert.

== Background ==
Lascoux (1995) described the history of Schubert polynomials.

The Schubert polynomials $\mathfrak{S}_w$ are polynomials in the variables $x_1,x_2,\ldots$ depending on an element $w$ of the infinite symmetric group $S_\infty$ of all permutations of $\N$ fixing all but a finite number of elements. They form a basis for the polynomial ring $\Z[x_1,x_2,\ldots]$ in infinitely many variables.

The cohomology of the flag manifold $\text{Fl}(m)$ is $\Z[x_1, x_2,\ldots, x_m]/I,$ where $I$ is the ideal generated by homogeneous symmetric functions of positive degree. The Schubert polynomial $\mathfrak{S}_w$ is the unique homogeneous polynomial of degree $\ell(w)$ representing the Schubert cycle of $w$ in the cohomology of the flag manifold $\text{Fl}(m)$ for all sufficiently large $m.$

== Properties ==
- If $w_0$ is the permutation of longest length in $S_n$ then $\mathfrak{S}_{w_0} = x_1^{n-1}x_2^{n-2} \cdots x_{n-1}^1$
- $\partial_i \mathfrak{S}_w = \mathfrak{S}_{ws_i}$ if $w(i) > w(i+1)$, where $s_i$ is the transposition $(i, i+1)$ and where $\partial_i$ is the divided difference operator taking $P$ to $(P - s_iP)/(x_i - x_{i+1})$.

Schubert polynomials can be calculated recursively from these two properties. In particular, this implies that $\mathfrak{S}_w = \partial_{w^{-1}w_0} x_1^{n-1}x_2^{n-2} \cdots x_{n-1}^1$.

Other properties are

- $\mathfrak{S}_{id} = 1$
- If $s_i$ is the transposition $(i,i+1)$, then $\mathfrak{S}_{s_i} = x_1 + \cdots + x_i$.
- If $w(i) < w(i + 1)$ for all $i \neq r$, then $\mathfrak{S}_w$ is the Schur polynomial $s_\lambda(x_1,\ldots,x_r)$ where $\lambda$ is the partition $(w(r) - r, \ldots, w(2) - 2, w(1) - 1)$. In particular all Schur polynomials (of a finite number of variables) are Schubert polynomials.
- Schubert polynomials have positive coefficients. A conjectural rule for their coefficients was put forth by Richard P. Stanley, and proven in two papers, one by Sergey Fomin and Stanley and one by Sara Billey, William Jockusch, and Stanley.
- The Schubert polynomials can be seen as a generating function over certain combinatorial objects called pipe dreams or rc-graphs. These are in bijection with reduced Kogan faces, (introduced in the PhD thesis of Mikhail Kogan) which are special faces of the Gelfand-Tsetlin polytope.
- Schubert polynomials also can be written as a weighted sum of objects called bumpless pipe dreams.

As an example

$$\mathfrak{S}_{51423}(x) = x_1 x_3^2 x_4 x_2^2+x_1^2 x_3 x_4 x_2^2+x_1^2 x_3^2 x_4 x_2.$$

== Multiplicative structure constants ==
Since the Schubert polynomials form a $\mathbb Z$-basis, there are unique coefficients $c^{\alpha}_{\beta\gamma}$ such that

$$\mathfrak{S}_\beta \mathfrak{S}_\gamma = \sum_\alpha c^{\alpha}_{\beta\gamma} \mathfrak{S}_\alpha.$$

These can be seen as a generalization of the Littlewood−Richardson coefficients described by the Littlewood–Richardson rule. For algebro-geometric reasons (Kleiman's transversality theorem of 1974), these coefficients are non-negative integers and it is an outstanding problem in representation theory and combinatorics to give a combinatorial rule for these numbers.

== Double Schubert polynomials ==
Double Schubert polynomials $\mathfrak{S}_w(x_1,x_2,\ldots, y_1,y_2,\ldots)$ are polynomials in two infinite sets of variables, parameterized by an element w of the infinite symmetric group, that becomes the usual Schubert polynomials when all the variables $y_i$ are $0$.

The double Schubert polynomial $\mathfrak{S}_w(x_1,x_2,\ldots, y_1,y_2,\ldots)$ are characterized by the properties

- $\mathfrak{S}_w(x_1,x_2,\ldots, y_1,y_2,\ldots) = \prod\limits_{i + j \leq n} (x_i - y_j)$ when $w$ is the permutation on $1,\ldots,n$ of longest length.
- $\partial_i \mathfrak{S}_w = \mathfrak{S}_{ws_i}$ if $w(i) > w(i+1).$

The double Schubert polynomials can also be defined as

$$\mathfrak{S}_w(x,y) =\sum_{ w=v^{-1}u \text{ and } \ell(w)=\ell(u)+\ell(v) } \mathfrak{S}_u(x) \mathfrak{S}_v(-y).$$

== Quantum Schubert polynomials ==
Fomin, Gelfand & Postnikov (1997) introduced quantum Schubert polynomials, that have the same relation to the (small) quantum cohomology of flag manifolds that ordinary Schubert polynomials have to the ordinary cohomology.

== Universal Schubert polynomials ==
Fulton (1999) introduced universal Schubert polynomials, that generalize classical and quantum Schubert polynomials. He also described universal double Schubert polynomials generalizing double Schubert polynomials.

== See also ==
- Stanley symmetric function
- Kostant polynomial
- Monk's formula gives the product of a linear Schubert polynomial and a Schubert polynomial.
- nil-Coxeter algebra
