= Brendan Hassett =

American mathematician

Brendan Edward Hassett is an American mathematician who is a professor of mathematics at Brown University. His research interests include algebraic geometry and number theory.

== Education and career ==
Hassett graduated from Yale College in 1992, and earned his doctorate in 1996 from Harvard University under the supervision of Joe Harris. After temporary positions at the Mittag-Leffler Institute, University of Chicago, and Chinese University of Hong Kong, he joined the Rice University faculty in 2000. He was promoted to full professor in 2006, chaired the department from 2009 to 2014, and was named as the Milton Brockett Porter Professor of Mathematics in 2013. In July 2015 he moved to Brown University. He has served as Director of Brown University's Institute for Computational and Experimental Research in Mathematics since 2016.

Hassett wrote the textbook Introduction to Algebraic Geometry (Cambridge University Press, 2007).

In 2013, Hassett was named as a fellow of the American Mathematical Society "for contributions to higher-dimensional arithmetic geometry and birational geometry."
