= Stanley symmetric function =

In mathematics and especially in algebraic combinatorics, the Stanley symmetric functions are a family of symmetric functions introduced by Richard Stanley (1984) in his study of the symmetric group of permutations.

Formally, the Stanley symmetric function F_{w}(x_{1}, x_{2}, ...) indexed by a permutation w is defined as a sum of certain fundamental quasisymmetric functions. Each summand corresponds to a reduced decomposition of w, that is, to a way of writing w as a product of a minimal possible number of adjacent transpositions. They were introduced in the course of Stanley's enumeration of the reduced decompositions of permutations, and in particular his proof that the permutation w_{0} = n(n − 1)...21 (written here in one-line notation) has exactly

$$\frac{\binom{n}{2}! }{1^{n - 1} \cdot 3^{n - 2} \cdot 5^{n - 3} \cdots (2n - 3)^1}$$

reduced decompositions. (Here $\binom{n}{2}$ denotes the binomial coefficient n(n − 1)/2 and ! denotes the factorial.)

== Properties ==
The Stanley symmetric function F_{w} is homogeneous with degree equal to the number of inversions of w. Unlike other nice families of symmetric functions, the Stanley symmetric functions have many linear dependencies and so do not form a basis of the ring of symmetric functions. When a Stanley symmetric function is expanded in the basis of Schur functions, the coefficients are all non-negative integers.

The Stanley symmetric functions have the property that they are the stable limit of Schubert polynomials

$$F_w(x) = \lim_{n \to \infty} \mathfrak{S}_{1^n \times w}(x)$$

where we treat both sides as formal power series, and take the limit coefficientwise.
