= Hasse–Schmidt derivation =

In mathematics, a Hasse–Schmidt derivation is an extension of the notion of a derivation. The concept was introduced by Schmidt & Hasse (1937).

== Definition ==
For a (not necessarily commutative nor associative) ring B and a B-algebra A, a Hasse–Schmidt derivation is a homomorphism of B-algebras

$$D: A \to A[\![t]\!]$$

taking values in the ring of formal power series with coefficients in A. This definition is found in several places, such as Gatto & Salehyan (2016, §3.4), which also contains the following example: for A being the ring of infinitely differentiable functions (defined on, say, R^{n}) and B=R, the map

$$f \mapsto \exp\left(t \frac d {dx}\right) f(x) = f + t \frac {df}{dx} + \frac {t^2}2 \frac {d^2 f}{dx^2} + \cdots$$

is a Hasse–Schmidt derivation, as follows from applying the Leibniz rule iteratedly.

== Equivalent characterizations ==
Hazewinkel (2012) shows that a Hasse–Schmidt derivation is equivalent to an action of the bialgebra

$$\operatorname{NSymm} = \mathbf Z \langle Z_1, Z_2, \ldots \rangle$$

of noncommutative symmetric functions in countably many variables Z_{1}, Z_{2}, ...: the part $D_i : A \to A$ of D which picks the coefficient of $t^i$ is the action of the indeterminate Z_{i}.

== Applications ==
Hasse–Schmidt derivations on the exterior algebra $A = \bigwedge M$ of some B-module M have been studied by Gatto & Salehyan (2016, §4). Basic properties of derivations in this context lead to a conceptual proof of the Cayley–Hamilton theorem. See also Gatto & Scherbak (2015).
