= Fat Chance: Probability from 0 to 1 =

Textbook on probability theory

- First edition
- Author: Benedict Gross; Joe Harris; Emily Riehl
- Language: English
- Subject: Probability theory
- Genre: Mathematics
- Publisher: Cambridge University Press
- Publication date: 2019

Fat Chance: Probability from 0 to 1 is an introductory undergraduate-level textbook on probability theory, centered on the metaphor of games of chance. It was written by Benedict Gross, Joe Harris, and Emily Riehl, based on a course for non-mathematicians taught to Harvard University undergraduates, and published by the Cambridge University Press in 2019. An associated online course has been offered to the public by Harvard.

== Topics ==
Unusually for a probability theory book, this book does not use the phrase "random variable", instead referring to random processes as games. The first five chapters of the book concern counting problems, and include material on the exponential function, binomial coefficients, factorials, games of cards, dice, and coins, and the birthday paradox. After an interlude involving the binomial theorem, Pascal's triangle, and the Catalan numbers, the second part of the book concerns probability more directly. Its chapters concern the expected value, conditional probability and Bayes' theorem, events with unequal probabilities (biased coins and loaded dice), geometric probability, the law of large numbers, and normal distributions. The third part moves from probability to statistics, with topics including the central limit theorem and the meaning of false positives and false negatives in medical testing.

== Audience and reception ==
Although the main purpose of the book is to be a textbook for college courses aimed at non-mathematicians, it can also be read independently by those interested in the topic. Reviewer Ludwig Paditz recommends the book to "readers without deeper knowledge in elementary statistics and probability". Reviewer Massimo Nespolo recommends as well that its readers take advantage of the associated online course offering.
