= Noncommutative symmetric function =

In mathematics, the noncommutative symmetric functions form a Hopf algebra NSymm analogous to the Hopf algebra of symmetric functions. The Hopf algebra NSymm was introduced by Israel M. Gelfand, Daniel Krob, Alain Lascoux, Bernard Leclerc, Vladimir Retakh, and Jean-Yves Thibon. It is noncommutative but cocommutative graded Hopf algebra. It has the Hopf algebra of symmetric functions as a quotient, and is a subalgebra of the Hopf algebra of permutations, and is the graded dual of the Hopf algebra of quasisymmetric function. Over the rational numbers it is isomorphic as a Hopf algebra to the universal enveloping algebra of the free Lie algebra on countably many variables.

== Definition ==
The underlying algebra of the Hopf algebra of noncommutative symmetric functions is the free ring Z⟨Z_{1}, Z_{2},...⟩ generated by non-commuting variables Z_{1}, Z_{2}, ...

The coproduct takes Z_{n} to Σ Z_{i} ⊗ Z_{n–i}, where Z_{0} = 1 is the identity.

The counit takes Z_{i} to 0 for i > 0 and takes Z_{0} = 1 to 1.

== Related notions ==
Michiel Hazewinkel showed that a Hasse–Schmidt derivation

$$D: A \to A [[t]]$$

on a ring A is equivalent to an action of NSymm on A: the part $D_i : A \to A$ of D which picks the coefficient of $t^i$, is the action of the indeterminate Z_{i}.

=== Relation to free Lie algebra ===
The element Σ Z_{n}t^{n} is a group-like element of the Hopf algebra of formal power series over NSymm, so over the rationals its logarithm is primitive. The coefficients of its logarithm generate the free Lie algebra on a countable set of generators over the rationals. Over the rationals this identifies the Hopf algebra NSYmm with the universal enveloping algebra of the free Lie algebra.
