= Kostant polynomial =

In mathematics, the Kostant polynomials, named after Bertram Kostant, provide an explicit basis of the ring of polynomials over the ring of polynomials invariant under the finite reflection group of a root system.

== Background ==
If the reflection group W corresponds to the Weyl group of a compact semisimple group K with maximal torus T, then the Kostant polynomials describe the structure of the de Rham cohomology of the generalized flag manifold K/T, also isomorphic to G/B where G is the complexification of K and B is the corresponding Borel subgroup. Armand Borel showed that its cohomology ring is isomorphic to the quotient of the ring of polynomials by the ideal generated by the invariant homogeneous polynomials of positive degree. This ring had already been considered by Claude Chevalley in establishing the foundations of the cohomology of compact Lie groups and their homogeneous spaces with André Weil, Jean-Louis Koszul and Henri Cartan; the existence of such a basis was used by Chevalley to prove that the ring of invariants was itself a polynomial ring. A detailed account of Kostant polynomials was given by Bernstein, Gelfand & Gelfand (1973) and independently Demazure (1973) as a tool to understand the Schubert calculus of the flag manifold. The Kostant polynomials are related to the Schubert polynomials defined combinatorially by Lascoux & Schützenberger (1982) for the classical flag manifold, when G = SL(n,C). Their structure is governed by difference operators associated to the corresponding root system.

Steinberg (1975) defined an analogous basis when the polynomial ring is replaced by the ring of exponentials of the weight lattice. If K is simply connected, this ring can be identified with the representation ring R(T) and the W-invariant subring with R(K). Steinberg's basis was again motivated by a problem on the topology of homogeneous spaces; the basis arises in describing the T-equivariant K-theory of K/T.

== Definition ==
Let Φ be a root system in a finite-dimensional real inner product space V with Weyl group W. Let Φ^{+} be a set of positive roots and Δ the corresponding set of simple roots. If α is a root, then s_{α} denotes the corresponding reflection operator. Roots are regarded as linear polynomials on V using the inner product α(v) = (α,v). The choice of Δ gives rise to a Bruhat order on the Weyl group determined by the ways of writing elements minimally as products of simple root reflection. The minimal length for an element s is denoted $\ell(s)$. Pick an element v in V such that α(v) > 0 for every positive root.

If α_{i} is a simple root with reflection operator s_{i}

$$s_i x= x- 2{(x,\alpha_i)\over (\alpha_i,\alpha_i)}\alpha_i,$$

then the corresponding divided difference operator is defined by

$$\delta_i f = {f-f\circ s_i\over \alpha_i}.$$

If $\ell(s)=m$ and s has reduced expression

$$s=s_{i_1}\cdots s_{i_m},$$

then

$$\delta_s=\delta_{i_1}\cdots \delta_{i_m}$$

is independent of the reduced expression. Moreover

$$\delta_s\delta_t=\delta_{st}$$

if $\ell(st)=\ell(s)+\ell(t)$ and 0 otherwise.

If w_{0} is the longest element of W, the element of greatest length or equivalently the element sending Φ^{+} to −Φ^{+}, then

$$\delta_{w_0}f= {\sum_{s \in W} \det s \, f\circ s\over \prod_{\alpha>0} \alpha}.$$

More generally

$$\delta_{s}f={\det s \, f\circ s + \sum_{t<s} a_{s,t} \,f\circ t\over \prod_{\alpha>0, \, s^{-1}\alpha<0} \alpha}$$

for some constants a_{s,t}.

Set

$$d= |W|^{-1}\prod_{\alpha>0} \alpha.$$

and

$$P_s=\delta_{s^{-1}w_0} d.$$

Then P_{s} is a homogeneous polynomial of degree $\ell(s)$.

These polynomials are the Kostant polynomials.

== Properties ==
Theorem. The Kostant polynomials form a free basis of the ring of polynomials over the W-invariant polynomials.

In fact the matrix

$$N_{st} =\delta_s (P_t)$$

is unitriangular for any total order such that s ≥ t implies $\ell(s)\ge \ell(t)$.

Hence

$$\det N=1.$$

Thus if

$$f = \sum_s a_s P_s$$

with a_{s} invariant under W, then

$$\delta_t(f) = \sum_s \delta_t(P_s) a_s.$$

Thus

$$a_s = \sum_t M_{s,t} \delta_t(f),$$

where

$$M=N^{-1}$$

another unitriangular matrix with polynomial entries. It can be checked directly that a_{s} is invariant under W.

In fact δ_{i} satisfies the derivation property

$$\delta_i(fg)=\delta_i(f)g + (f\circ s_i)\delta_i(g).$$

Hence

$$\delta_i\delta_s(f) = \sum_t \delta_i( \delta_s(P_t))a_t) = \sum_t (\delta_s(P_t)\circ s_i)\delta_i(a_t) + \sum_t \delta_i\delta_s(P_t)a_t.$$

Since

$$\delta_i\delta_s=\delta_{s_is}$$

or 0, it follows that

$$\sum_t \delta_s(P_t)\,\delta_i(a_t)\circ s_i=0$$

so that by the invertibility of N

$$\delta_i(a_t)=0$$

for all i, i.e. a_{t} is invariant under W.

== Steinberg basis ==
As above let Φ be a root system in a real inner product space V, and Φ^{+} a subset of positive roots. From these data we obtain the subset Δ = {α_{1}, α_{2}, ..., α_{n}} of the simple roots, the coroots

$$\alpha_i^\vee=2(\alpha_i,\alpha_i)^{-1}\alpha_i,$$

and the fundamental weights λ_{1}, λ_{2}, ..., λ_{n} as the dual basis of the coroots.

For each element s in W, let Δ_{s} be the subset of Δ consisting of the simple roots satisfying s^{−1}α < 0, and put

$$\lambda_s = s^{-1}\sum_{\alpha_i \in \Delta_s} \lambda_i,$$

where the sum is calculated in the weight lattice P.

The set of linear combinations of the exponentials e^{μ} with integer coefficients for μ in P becomes a ring over Z isomorphic to the group algebra of P, or equivalently to the representation ring R(T) of T, where T is a maximal torus in K, the simply connected, connected compact semisimple Lie group with root system Φ. If W is the Weyl group of Φ, then the representation ring R(K) of K can be identified with R(T)^{W}.

Steinberg's theorem. The exponentials λ_{s} (s in W) form a free basis for the ring of exponentials over the subring of W-invariant exponentials.

Let ρ denote the half sum of the positive roots, and A denote the antisymmetrisation operator

$$A(\psi)=\sum_{s\in W} (-1)^{\ell(s)} s\cdot \psi.$$

The positive roots β with sβ positive can be seen as a set of positive roots for a root system on a subspace of V; the roots are the ones orthogonal to s.λ_{s}. The corresponding Weyl group equals the stabilizer of λ_{s} in W. It is generated by the simple reflections s_{j} for which sα_{j} is a positive root.

Let M and N be the matrices

$$M_{ts}=t(\lambda_s),\,\,N_{st}= (-1)^{\ell(t)}\cdot t(\psi_s),$$

where ψ_{s} is given by the weight s^{−1}ρ - λ_{s}. Then the matrix

$$B_{s,s'}=\Omega^{-1}(NM)_{s,s'}={A(\psi_s\lambda_{s'})\over \Omega}$$

is triangular with respect to any total order on W such that s ≥ t implies $\ell(s)\ge \ell(t)$. Steinberg proved that the entries of B are W-invariant exponential sums. Moreover, its diagonal entries all equal 1, so it has determinant 1. Hence its inverse C has the same form. Define

$$\varphi_s=\sum C_{s,t}\psi_t.$$

If χ is an arbitrary exponential sum, then it follows that

$$\chi=\sum_{s\in W} a_s \lambda_s$$

with a_{s} the W-invariant exponential sum

$$a_s ={A(\varphi_s\chi)\over \Omega}.$$

Indeed, this is the unique solution of the system of equations

$$t\chi=\sum_{s\in W} t(\lambda_s)\,\,a_s=\sum_s M_{t,s}a_s.$$
