= Giambelli's formula =

Mathematical formula

In mathematics, Giambelli's formula, named after Giovanni Giambelli, expresses Schubert classes as determinants in terms of special Schubert classes.

It states

$$\displaystyle \sigma_\lambda= \det(\sigma_{\lambda_i+j-i})_{1\le i,j\le r}$$

where σ_{λ} is the Schubert class of a partition λ.

Giambelli's formula may be derived as a consequence of Pieri's formula. The Porteous formula is a generalization to morphisms of vector bundles over a variety.

In the theory of symmetric functions, the same identity, known as the first Jacobi-Trudi identity expresses Schur functions as determinants in terms of complete symmetric functions. There is also the dual second Jacobi-Trudi identity which expresses Schur functions as determinants in terms of elementary symmetric functions. The corresponding identity also holds for Schubert classes.

There is another Giambelli identity, expressing Schur functions as determinants of matrices whose entries are Schur functions corresponding to hook partitions contained within the same Young diagram. This too is valid for Schubert classes, as are all Schur function identities. For instance, hook partition Schur functions can be expressed bilinearly in terms of elementary and complete symmetric functions, and Schubert classes satisfy these same relations.

== See also ==
- Schubert calculus - includes examples
