= Institute for Computational and Experimental Research in Mathematics =

Research institute at Brown University

- ICERM
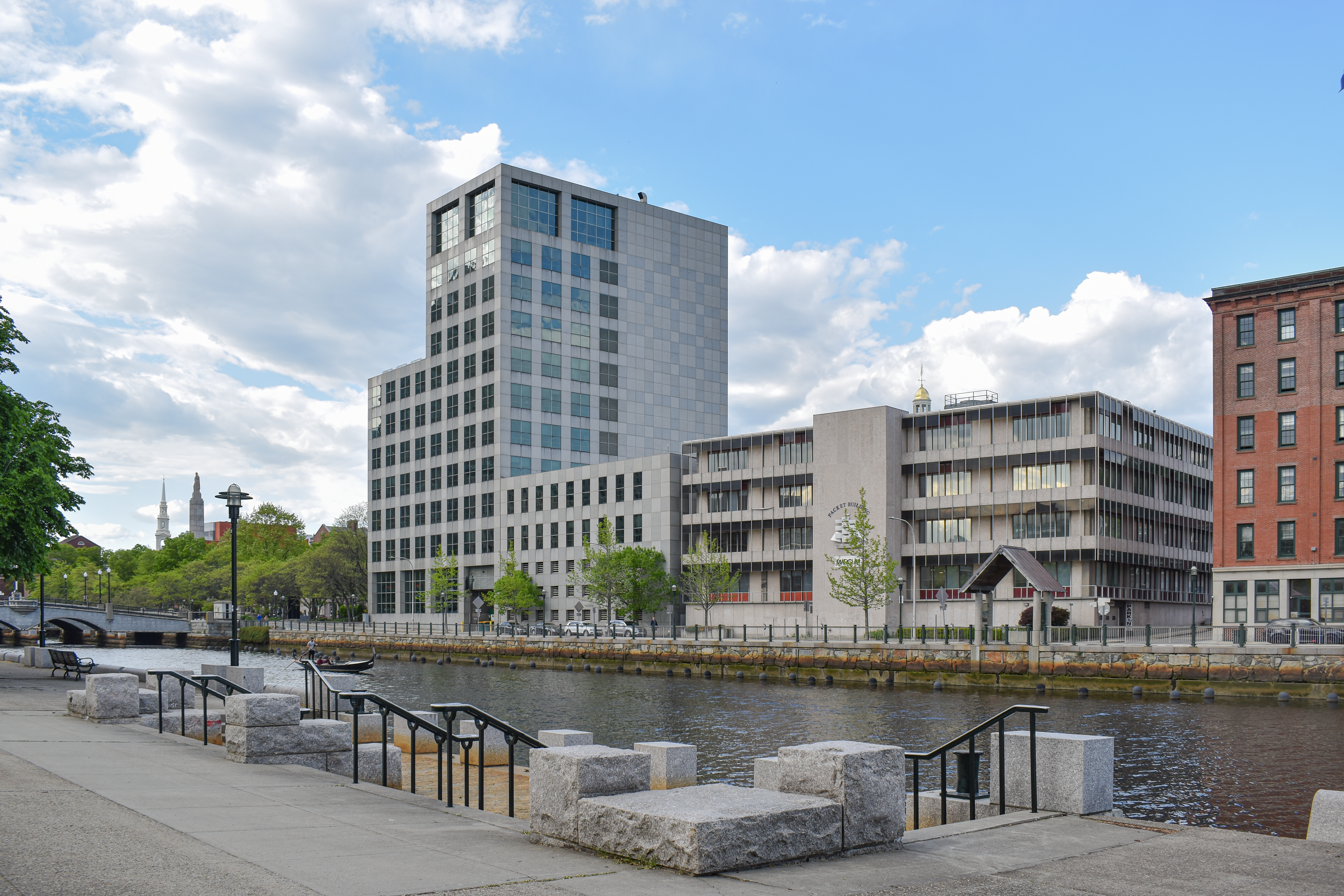
- The top two floors of this building house ICERM
- Established: 2011; 14 years ago
- Director: Brendan Hassett
- Address: 121 South Main Street
- Location: Providence, Rhode Island, United States; 41.824002°N 71.406663°W
- Website: icerm.brown.edu

The Institute for Computational and Experimental Research in Mathematics (ICERM), founded in 2011, is an American research institute in mathematics at Brown University, funded since 2010 by a grant from the National Science Foundation.

== About ==
At the time of its founding, the institute was the eighth of its kind in the nation and the first in New England. It is located in downtown Providence, Rhode Island in a building it shares with the Brown University School of Public Health.

The Institute for Computational and Experimental Research in Mathematics (ICERM), holds numerous events and workshops throughout the year. Workshops range from one day events all the way up to week-long conferences and conventions. A notable ICERM workshop was, "Illustrating Mathematics" (2016), which brought mathematicians and digital artist together.

== Directors of ICERM ==
- Jill Pipher (2011–2016)
- Brendan Hassett (2016–present)
