= Lucia Caporaso =

Italian mathematician and academic

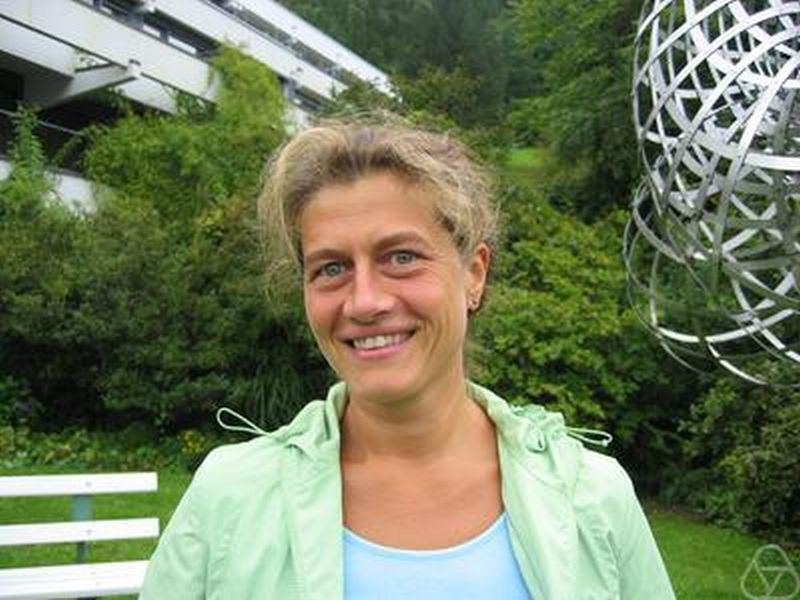
Lucia Caporaso in Oberwolfach, 2006

Lucia Caporaso is an Italian mathematician, holding a professorship in mathematics at Roma Tre University. She was born in Rome, Italy, on 22 May 1965. Her research includes work in algebraic geometry, arithmetic geometry, tropical geometry and enumerative geometry.

== Education and career ==
Caporaso earned a laurea from Sapienza University of Rome in 1989. She completed her Ph.D. at Harvard University in 1993. Her dissertation, On a Compactification of the Universal Picard Variety over the Moduli Space of Stable Curves, was supervised by Joe Harris.

She became a Benjamin Pierce Assistant Professor of Mathematics at Harvard, a researcher at the University of Rome Tor Vergata, an assistant professor at the Massachusetts Institute of Technology, and an associate professor at the University of Sannio, before moving to Roma Tre as a professor in 2001. From 2013 to 2018, she has headed the Department of Mathematics and Physics at Roma Tre.

== Recognition ==
Caporaso was the 1998 winner of the Bartolozzi Prize.

She is an invited speaker at the 2018 International Congress of Mathematicians, speaking in the section on algebraic and complex geometry.
