= Descent algebra =

In algebra, Solomon's descent algebra of a Coxeter group is a subalgebra of the integral group ring of the Coxeter group, introduced by Solomon (1976).

== The descent algebra of the symmetric group ==
In the special case of the symmetric group S_{n}, the descent algebra is given by the elements of the group ring such that permutations with the same descent set have the same coefficients. (The descent set of a permutation σ consists of the indices i such that σ(i) > σ(i+1).) The descent algebra of the symmetric group S_{n} has dimension 2^{n-1}. It contains the peak algebra as a left ideal.
