= Determinantal variety =

In algebraic geometry, determinantal varieties are spaces of matrices with a given upper bound on their ranks. Their significance comes from the fact that many examples in algebraic geometry are of this form, such as the Segre embedding of a product of two projective spaces.

== Definition ==
Given m and n and r < min(m, n), the determinantal variety Y_{r} is the set of all m × n matrices (over a field k) with rank ≤ r. This is naturally an algebraic set as the condition that a matrix have rank ≤ r is given by the vanishing of all of its (r + 1) × (r + 1) minors; in fact this is an algebraic variety, since the ideal generated by these minors is prime. Considering the generic m × n matrix whose entries are algebraically independent variables x_{i,j}, these minors are polynomials of degree r + 1. The ideal of k[x_{i,j}] generated by these polynomials is a determinantal ideal. Since the equations defining minors are homogeneous, one can consider Y_{r} either as an affine variety in mn-dimensional affine space, or as a projective variety in (mn − 1)-dimensional projective space.

== Properties ==
The ideal defining the determinantal variety is generated by the (r + 1) × (r + 1) minors of a generic square matrix, that is a matrix whose entries are distinct indeterminates. This ideal is a prime ideal in the polynomial ring in these indeterminates (Bruns-Vetter, Theorem 2.10).

Assuming that we consider Y_{r} as an affine variety, its dimension is r(m + n − r). One way to see this is as follows: form the product space $\mathbf{A}^{mn} \times \mathbf{Gr}(r,m)$ over $\mathbf{A}^{mn}$ where $\mathbf{Gr}(r,m)$ is the Grassmannian of r-planes in an m-dimensional vector space, and consider the subspace $Z_r = \{ (A, W) \mid A(k^n) \subseteq W \}$, which is a desingularization of $Y_r$ (over the open set of matrices with rank exactly r, this map is an isomorphism), and $Z_r$ is a vector bundle over $\mathbf{Gr}(r,m)$ which is isomorphic to $\mathrm{Hom}(k^n, \mathcal{R})$ where $\mathcal{R}$ is the tautological bundle over the Grassmannian. So $\dim Y_r = \dim Z_r$ since they are birationally equivalent, and $\dim Z_r = \dim \mathbf{Gr}(r,m) + nr = r(m-r) + nr$ since the fiber of $\mathrm{Hom}(k^n, \mathcal{R})$ has dimension nr.

The above shows that the matrices of rank <r contains the singular locus of $Y_r$, and in fact one has equality. This fact can be verified using that the radical ideal is given by the minors along with the Jacobian criterion for nonsingularity.

The variety Y_{r} naturally has an action of $G = \mathbf{GL}(m) \times \mathbf{GL}(n)$, a product of general linear groups. The problem of determining the syzygies of $Y_r$, when the characteristic of the field is zero, was solved by Alain Lascoux, using the natural action of G.

== Related topics ==
One can "globalize" the notion of determinantal varieties by considering the space of linear maps between two vector bundles on an algebraic variety. Then the determinantal varieties fall into the general study of degeneracy loci. An expression for the cohomology class of these degeneracy loci is given by the Thom-Porteous formula, see (Fulton-Pragacz).
