= Gelfand =

Gelfand is a surname meaning "elephant" in the Yiddish language, and may refer to:

== People ==
- Alan Gelfand, inventor of the ollie, a skateboarding move
- Alan E. Gelfand, statistician
- Boris Gelfand, chess grandmaster
- Israel Gelfand, mathematician
- Israel Lazarevich Gelfand, Russian-born SPD agent
- Mikhail Gelfand, molecular biologist and bioinformacist, grandson of Israel (mathematician)
- Vladimir Gelfand, Soviet-Jewish writer

== Notions in mathematics ==
Named after Israel Gelfand:

- the Gelfand representation allows a complete characterization of commutative C*-algebras as algebras of continuous complex-valued functions
- the Gelfand–Naimark–Segal construction
- the Gelfand–Naimark theorem
- the Gelfand–Mazur theorem
- a Gelfand pair, a pair (G,K) consisting of a locally compact unimodular group G and a compact subgroup K
- a Gelfand triple, a construction designed to link the distribution (test function) and square-integrable aspects of functional analysis

== See also ==
- Gelfond
- Helfand
- Helfant
