= Lev Borisovich Helfand =

Soviet diplomat (1900–1957)

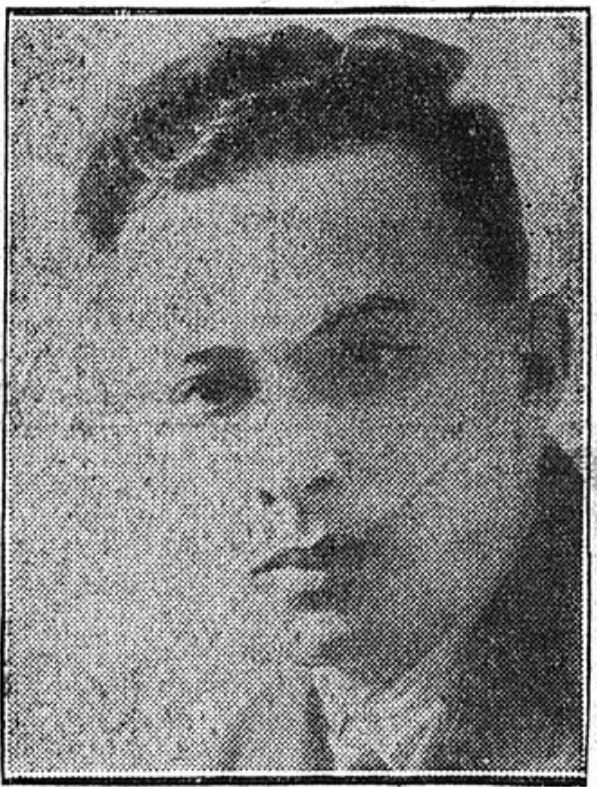
- Photo of Lev Borisovich Helfand published in L’Écho de Paris on May 1st, 1930.
- Born: December 22, 1900; Arkhemivka, Piryatinsky Uyezd, Poltava Governorate, Russian Empire
- Died: 1957; New York, USA

Signature
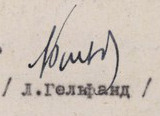

Lev Borisovich Helfand (Russian: Лев Борисович Гельфанд; 10 December 1900 – 22 March 1957), also known as Leon Moore, was a Soviet chargé d'affaires to Italy in the end of 1939. Born in Poltava, Ukraine, he was in Italy during the 1930s, coinciding with the time that the National Fascist Party was in power. When he was recalled to Moscow in 1940, he chose to flee to the United States with his wife, the actress Sofia Shatsova, fearing deportation to Siberia or being killed at once in Stalin's purges. He adopted the name Moore. He died in New York in 1957.
