= Porteous formula =

In mathematics, the Porteous formula, or Thom–Porteous formula, or Giambelli–Thom–Porteous formula, is the expression for the fundamental class of a degeneracy locus (or determinantal variety) of a morphism of vector bundles in terms of Chern classes. Giambelli's formula is roughly the special case when the vector bundles are sums of line bundles over projective space. Thom (1957) pointed out that the fundamental class must be a polynomial in the Chern classes and found this polynomial in a few special cases, and Porteous (1971) found the polynomial in general. Kempf & Laksov (1974) proved a more general version, and Fulton (1992) generalized it further.

== Statement ==
Given a morphism of vector bundles E, F of ranks m and n over a smooth variety, its k-th degeneracy locus (k ≤ min(m,n)) is the variety of points where it has rank at most k. If all components of the degeneracy locus have the expected codimension (m – k)(n – k) then Porteous's formula states that its fundamental class is the determinant of the matrix of size m – k whose (i, j) entry is the Chern class c_{n–k+j–i}(F – E).
