= Schubert variety =

In algebraic geometry, a Schubert variety is a certain subvariety of a Grassmannian, $\mathbf{Gr}_k(V)$ of $k$-dimensional subspaces of a vector space $V$, usually with singular points. Like the Grassmannian, it is a kind of moduli space, whose elements satisfy conditions giving lower bounds to the dimensions of the intersections of its elements $w\subset V$, with the elements of a specified complete flag. Here $V$ may be a vector space over an arbitrary field, but most commonly this taken to be either the real or the complex numbers.

A typical example is the set $X$ of $2$-dimensional subspaces $w \subset V$ of a 4-dimensional space $V$ that intersect a fixed (reference) 2-dimensional subspace $V_2$ nontrivially.

$$X \ =\ \{w\subset V \mid \dim(w)=2,\, \dim(w \cap V_2)\ge 1\}.$$

Over the real number field, this can be pictured in usual xyz-space as follows. Replacing subspaces with their corresponding projective spaces, and intersecting with an affine coordinate patch of $\mathbb{P}(V)$, we obtain an open subset X° ⊂ X. This is isomorphic to the set of all lines L (not necessarily through the origin) which meet the x-axis. Each such line L corresponds to a point of X°, and continuously moving L in space (while keeping contact with the x-axis) corresponds to a curve in X°. Since there are three degrees of freedom in moving L (moving the point on the x-axis, rotating, and tilting), X is a three-dimensional real algebraic variety. However, when L is equal to the x-axis, it can be rotated or tilted around any point on the axis, and this excess of possible motions makes L a singular point of X.

More generally, a Schubert variety in $\mathbf{Gr}_k(V)$ is defined by specifying the minimal dimension of intersection of a $k$-dimensional subspace $w\subset V$ with each of the spaces in a fixed reference complete flag $V_1\subset V_2\subset \cdots \subset V_n=V$, where $\dim V_j=j$. (In the example above, this would mean requiring certain intersections of the line L with the x-axis and the xy-plane.)

In even greater generality, given a semisimple algebraic group $G$ with a Borel subgroup $B$ and a standard parabolic subgroup $P$, it is known that the homogeneous space $G/P$, which is an example of a flag variety, consists of finitely many $B$-orbits, which may be parametrized by certain elements $w\in W$ of the Weyl group $W$. The closure of the $B$-orbit associated to an element $w\in W$ is denoted $X_{w}$ and is called a Schubert variety in $G/P$. The classical case corresponds to $G=SL_n$, with $P=P_k$, the $k$th maximal parabolic subgroup of $SL_n$, so that $G/P = \mathbf{Gr}_k(\mathbf{C}^n)$ is the Grassmannian of $k$-planes in $\mathbf{C}^n$.

== Significance ==
Schubert varieties form one of the most important and best studied classes of singular algebraic varieties. A certain measure of singularity of Schubert varieties is provided by Kazhdan–Lusztig polynomials, which encode their local Goresky–MacPherson intersection cohomology.

The algebras of regular functions on Schubert varieties have deep significance in algebraic combinatorics and are examples of algebras with a straightening law. (Co)homology of the Grassmannian, and more generally, of more general flag varieties, has a basis consisting of the (co)homology classes of Schubert varieties, or Schubert cycles. The study of the intersection theory on the Grassmannian was initiated by Hermann Schubert and continued by Zeuthen in the 19th century under the heading of enumerative geometry. This area was deemed by David Hilbert important enough to be included as the fifteenth of his celebrated 23 problems. The study continued in the 20th century as part of the general development of algebraic topology and representation theory, but accelerated in the 1990s beginning with the work of William Fulton on the degeneracy loci and Schubert polynomials, following up on earlier investigations of Bernstein–Gelfand–Gelfand and Demazure in representation theory in the 1970s, Lascoux and Schützenberger in combinatorics in the 1980s, and Fulton and MacPherson in intersection theory of singular algebraic varieties, also in the 1980s.

== See also ==
- Schubert calculus
- Bruhat decomposition
- Bott–Samelson resolution
- Schubert polynomial
