= Hermann Schubert =

German mathematician

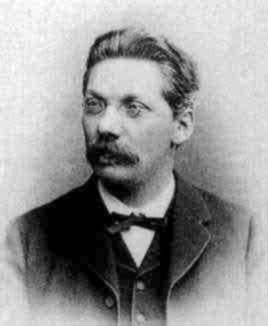
- Hermann Cäsar Hannibal Schubert
- Born: 22 May 1848; Potsdam, Brandenburg, Prussia
- Died: 20 July 1911 (aged 63); Hamburg, Germany
- Education: Universität Berlin
- Known for: Enumerative geometry Schubert calculus
- Scientific career
- Fields: Mathematician
- Workplaces: Realgymnasium Andreanum

Hermann Cäsar Hannibal Schubert (22 May 1848 – 20 July 1911) was a German mathematician.

Schubert was one of the leading developers of enumerative geometry, which considers those parts of algebraic geometry that involve a finite number of solutions. In 1874, Schubert won a prize for solving a question posed by Zeuthen. Schubert calculus was named after him.

Schubert tutored Adolf Hurwitz at the Realgymnasium Andreanum in Hildesheim, Hanover, and arranged for Hurwitz to study under Felix Klein at University.

== See also ==
- Schubert cycle or Schubert variety
- Schubert polynomial

== Publications ==
- Schubert, Hermann (1979) [1879], Kleiman, Steven L. (ed.), Kalkül der abzählenden Geometrie, Reprint of the 1879 original (in German), Berlin-New York: Springer-Verlag, ISBN 3-540-09233-1, MR 0555576
