= Steiner's conic problem =

In enumerative geometry, Steiner's conic problem is the problem of finding the number of smooth conics tangent to five given conics in the plane in general position. If the problem is considered in the complex projective plane CP^{2}, the correct solution is 3264. The problem is named after Jakob Steiner who first posed it and who gave an incorrect solution in 1848.

== History ==
Steiner claimed that the number of conics tangent to 5 given conics in general position is 7776 = 6^{5}, but later realized this was wrong. The correct number 3264 was found in about 1859 by Ernest de Jonquières who did not publish because of Steiner's reputation, and by Chasles using his theory of characteristics, and by Berner in 1865. However these results, like many others in classical intersection theory, do not seem to have been given complete proofs until the work of Fulton and MacPherson in about 1978.

== Formulation and solution ==
The space of (possibly degenerate) conics in the complex projective plane CP^{2} can be identified with the complex projective space CP^{5} (since each conic is defined by a homogeneous degree-2 polynomial in three variables, with 6 complex coefficients, and multiplying such a polynomial by a non-zero complex number does not change the conic). Steiner observed that the conics tangent to a given conic form a degree 6 hypersurface in CP^{5}. So the conics tangent to 5 given conics correspond to the intersection points of 5 degree 6 hypersurfaces, and by Bézout's theorem the number of intersection points of 5 generic degree 6 hypersurfaces is 6^{5} = 7776, which was Steiner's incorrect solution. The reason this is wrong is that the five degree 6 hypersurfaces are not in general position and have a common intersection in the Veronese surface, corresponding to the set of double lines in the plane, all of which have double intersection points with the 5 conics. In particular the intersection of these 5 hypersurfaces is not even 0-dimensional but has a 2-dimensional component. So to find the correct answer, one has to somehow eliminate the plane of spurious degenerate conics from this calculation.

One way of eliminating the degenerate conics is to blow up CP^{5} along the Veronese surface. The Chow ring of the blowup is generated by H and E, where H is the total transform of a hyperplane and E is the exceptional divisor. The total transform of a degree 6 hypersurface is 6H, and Steiner calculated (6H)^{5} = 6^{5}P as H^{5}=P (where P is the class of a point in the Chow ring). However the number of conics is not (6H)^{5} but (6H−2E)^{5} because the strict transform of the hypersurface of conics tangent to a given conic is 6H−2E.

Suppose that L = 2H−E is the strict transform of the conics tangent to a given line. Then the intersection numbers of H and L are given by H^{5}=1P, H^{4}L=2P, H^{3}L^{2}=4P, H^{2}L^{3}=4P, H^{1}L^{4}=2P, L^{5}=1P. So we have (6H−2E)^{5} = (2H+2L)^{5} = 3264P.

Fulton & MacPherson gave a precise description of exactly what "general position" means (although their two propositions about this are not quite right, and are corrected in a note on page 29 of their paper). If the five conics have the properties that

- there is no line such that every one of the 5 conics is either tangent to it or passes through one of two fixed points on it (otherwise there is a "double line with 2 marked points" tangent to all 5 conics)
- no three of the conics pass through any point (otherwise there is a "double line with 2 marked points" tangent to all 5 conics passing through this triple intersection point)
- no two of the conics are tangent
- no three of the five conics are tangent to a line
- a pair of lines each tangent to two of the conics do not intersect on the fifth conic (otherwise this pair is a degenerate conic tangent to all 5 conics)

then the total number of conics C tangent to all 5 (counted with multiplicities) is 3264. Here the multiplicity is given by the product over all 5 conics C_{i} of (4 − number of intersection points of C and C_{i}). In particular if C intersects each of the five conics in exactly 3 points (one double point of tangency and two others) then the multiplicity is 1, and if this condition always holds then there are exactly 3264 conics tangent to the 5 given conics.

Over other algebraically closed fields the answer is similar, unless the field has characteristic 2 in which case the number of conics is 51 rather than 3264.
