= Emily Riehl =

American mathematician

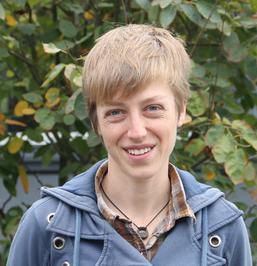
- Emily Riehl in 2014
- Born: Thousand Oaks, California, US
- Education: Harvard University; University of Cambridge; University of Chicago
- Scientific career
- Fields: Mathematics
- Workplaces: Harvard University; Johns Hopkins University
- Thesis: Algebraic model structures (2011)
- Doctoral advisor: J. Peter May

Emily Riehl is an American mathematician who has contributed to higher category theory and homotopy theory. Much of her work, including her PhD thesis, concerns model structures and more recently the foundations of infinity-categories. She is the author of two textbooks and serves on the editorial boards of three journals.

== Education and career ==
Riehl was born in Thousand Oaks, California and grew up in Bloomington-Normal, Illinois. As a high school student at University High School in Normal in 2002, she won third place in the national Intel Science Talent Search for a project in mathematics entitled "On the Properties of Tits Graphs".

Riehl attended Harvard University as an undergraduate; with Benedict Gross as a mentor, she wrote a senior thesis on local class field theory. She also headed the school rugby team (in which she played as a scrum-half) and played viola in the Harvard–Radcliffe Orchestra. After Harvard, she completed part III of the Maths Tripos at Cambridge. She defended her doctoral dissertation, Algebraic model structures, at the University of Chicago in 2011, supervised by J. Peter May.

Between 2011 and 2015, Riehl held a position at Harvard University as a Benjamin Peirce Postdoctoral Fellow. Since 2015, she has been employed at Johns Hopkins University, where she became an associate professor in 2019. She became a full professor in 2022, and was appointed to JHU's Kelly Miller professorship of mathematics in July 2024.

In addition, she teaches on edX and has hosted videos for Numberphile. Along with Benedict Gross and Joe Harris, she developed a Harvard course on edX titled "Fat Chance: Probability from the Ground Up".

== Honors and awards ==
In January 2020, Riehl received the JHU President's Frontier Award, a $250,000 award that "supports individuals at Johns Hopkins who are breaking new ground and poised to become leaders in their field". She is the sixth JHU faculty member to receive the award.

Riehl was awarded the 2021 AWM Joan & Joseph Birman Research Prize "for her deep and foundational work in category theory and homotopy theory." She is the fourth winner of this prize. She was named a Fellow of the American Mathematical Society, in the 2022 class of fellows, "for contributions to research, exposition, and communication in higher category theory". In 2022 she was awarded a Simons Fellowship, and again in 2026.

== Service and outreach ==
Riehl is a host of the n-Category Café, a blog on subjects related to category theory in mathematics, physics, and philosophy. She was a board member of the LGBT mathematical association Spectra.

== Other activities ==
In addition to her mathematical work, Riehl has competed on the United States women's national Australian rules football team at the Australian Football International Cup, and was vice captain of the team at the 2017 cup.

She plays viola, guitar, and formerly played bass guitar in the band Unstraight.

== Books ==
- Categorical Homotopy Theory (2014)
- Category Theory in Context (2016)
- Fat Chance: Probability from 0 to 1, with Benedict Gross and Joe Harris (2019)
- Elements of ∞-Category Theory, with Dominic Verity (2022)
