= Peak algebra =

Mathematical concept

In mathematics, the peak algebra is a (non-unital) subalgebra of the group algebra of the symmetric group S_{n}, studied by Nyman (2003). It consists of the elements of the group algebra of the symmetric group whose coefficients are the same for permutations with the same peaks. (Here a peak of a permutation σ on {1,2,...,n} is an index i such that σ(i–1)<σ(i)>σ(i+1).) It is a left ideal of the descent algebra. The direct sum of the peak algebras for all n has a natural structure of a Hopf algebra.
