= Schubert calculus =

Branch of algebraic geometry

In mathematics, Schubert calculus is a branch of algebraic geometry introduced in the nineteenth century by Hermann Schubert in order to solve various counting problems of projective geometry and, as such, is viewed as part of enumerative geometry. Giving it a more rigorous foundation was the aim of Hilbert's 15th problem. It is related to several more modern concepts, such as characteristic classes, and both its algorithmic aspects and applications remain of current interest. The term Schubert calculus is sometimes used to mean the enumerative geometry of linear subspaces of a vector space, which is roughly equivalent to describing the cohomology ring of Grassmannians. Sometimes it is used to mean the more general enumerative geometry of algebraic varieties that are homogenous spaces of simple Lie groups. Even more generally, Schubert calculus is sometimes understood as encompassing the study of analogous questions in generalized cohomology theories.

The objects introduced by Schubert are the Schubert cells, which are locally closed sets in a Grassmannian defined by conditions of incidence of a linear subspace in projective space with a given flag. For further details see Schubert variety.

The intersection theory of these cells, which can be seen as the product structure in the cohomology ring of the Grassmannian, consisting of associated cohomology classes, allows in particular the determination of cases in which the intersections of cells results in a finite set of points. A key result is that the Schubert cells (or rather, the classes of their Zariski closures, the Schubert cycles or Schubert varieties) span the whole cohomology ring.

The combinatorial aspects mainly arise in relation to computing intersections of Schubert cycles. Lifted from the Grassmannian, which is a homogeneous space, to the general linear group that acts on it, similar questions are involved in the Bruhat decomposition and classification of parabolic subgroups (as block triangular matrices).

== Construction ==
Schubert calculus can be constructed using the Chow ring of the Grassmannian, where the generating cycles are represented by geometrically defined data. Denote the Grassmannian of $k$-planes in a fixed $n$-dimensional vector space $V$ over a field $F$ as $\mathbf{Gr}(k,V)$, and its Chow ring as $A^*(\mathbf{Gr}(k,V))$. (Note that the Grassmannian is sometimes denoted $\mathbf{Gr}(k,n)$ if the vector space is not explicitly given or as $\mathbb{G}(k-1,n-1)$ if the ambient space $V$ and its $k$-dimensional subspaces are replaced by their projectivizations.) Choosing an (arbitrary) complete flag over $F$

$$\mathcal{V} = (V_1 \subset \cdots \subset V_{n-1} \subset V_n = V), \quad \dim{V}_i = i, \quad i=1 , \dots , n,$$

to each weakly decreasing $k$-tuple of integers $\mathbf{a} = (a_1,\ldots, a_k)$, where

$$n-k \geq a_1 \geq a_2 \geq \cdots \geq a_k \geq 0,$$

i.e., to each partition of weight

$$\mathopen|\mathbf{a}\mathclose| = \sum_{i=1}^k a_i,$$

whose Young diagram fits into the $k \times (n-k)$ rectangular one for the partition $(n-k)^k$, we associate a Schubert variety (or Schubert cycle) $\Sigma_{\mathbf{a}}(\mathcal{V}) \subset \mathbf{Gr}(k,V)$, defined as

$$\Sigma_{\mathbf{a}}(\mathcal{V}) = \{ w \in \mathbf{Gr}(k,V)(F) : \dim (V_{n-k +i - a_i} \cap w) \geq i \text{ for } i = 1, \dots, k \}.$$

This is the closure, in the Zariski topology, of the Schubert cell

$$X_{\mathbf{a}}(\mathcal{V}) := \{ w \in \mathbf{Gr}(k,V)(F) : \dim (V_j \cap w) = i \text{ for all } n-k-a_i +i \leq j \leq n-k-a_{i+1} +i, \quad 1\le j \le n \} \subset \Sigma_{\mathbf{a}}(\mathcal{V}),$$

which is used when considering cellular homology instead of the Chow ring. The latter are disjoint affine spaces, of dimension $|\mathbf{a}|$, whose union is $\mathbf{Gr}(k,V)$.

An equivalent characterization of the Schubert cell $X_\mathbf{a}(\mathcal{V})$ may be given in terms of the dual complete flag

$$\tilde{\mathcal{V}}= (\tilde{V}_1 \subset \tilde{V}_2  \cdots \subset \tilde{V}_n = V),$$

where

$$\tilde{V}_i := V_n\backslash V_{n-i}, \quad i=1, \dots, n \quad (V_0:= \emptyset).$$

Then $X_{\mathbf{a}}(\mathcal{V}) \subset \mathbf{Gr}(k,V)$ consists of those $k$-dimensional subspaces $w \subset V$ that have a basis $(\tilde{W}_1, \dots, \tilde{W}_k)$ consisting of elements

$$\tilde{W}_i \in \tilde{V}_{k+a_i -i +1 }, \quad i=1, \dots, k$$

of the subspaces $\{\tilde{V}_{k+a_i -i +1}\}_{i=1, \dots, k}.$

Since the homology class $[\Sigma_{\mathbf{a}}(\mathcal{V})] \in A^*(\mathbf{Gr}(k,V))$, called a Schubert class, does not depend on the choice of complete flag $\mathcal{V}$, it can be written as

$$\sigma_{\mathbf{a}} := [\Sigma_{\mathbf{a}}] \in A^*(\mathbf{Gr}(k,V)).$$

It can be shown that these classes are linearly independent and generate the Chow ring as their linear span. The associated intersection theory is called Schubert calculus. For a given sequence $\mathbf{a} = (a_1,\ldots, a_j, 0, \ldots, 0)$ with $a_j>0$ the Schubert class $\sigma_{(a_1,\ldots, a_j,0,\ldots,0)}$ is usually just denoted $\sigma_{(a_1,\ldots, a_j)}$. The Schubert classes given by a single integer $\sigma_{a_1}$, (i.e., a horizontal partition), are called special classes. Using the Giambelli formula below, all the Schubert classes can be generated from these special classes.

=== Other notational conventions ===
In some sources, the Schubert cells $X_\mathbf{a}$ and Schubert varieties $\Sigma_\mathbf{a}$ are labelled differently, as $S_\lambda$ and $\bar{S}_\lambda$, respectively, where $\lambda$ is the complementary partition to $\mathbf{a}$ with parts

$$\lambda_i := n-k-a_{k-i+1}$$,

whose Young diagram is the complement of the one for $\mathbf{a}$ within the $k \times (n-k)$ rectangular one (reversed, both horizontally and vertically).

Another labelling convention for $X_\mathbf{a}$ and $\Sigma_\mathbf{a}$ is $C_L$ and $\bar{C}_L$, respectively, where $L= (L_1, \dots, L_k) \subset (1, \dots, n)$ is the multi-index defined by

$$L_i := n-k - a_i +i=\lambda_{k-i+1} +i.$$

The integers $(L_1, \dots, L_k)$ are the pivot locations of the representations of elements of $X_{\mathbf{a}}$ in reduced matricial echelon form.

=== Explanation ===
In order to explain the definition, consider a generic $k$-plane $w \subset V$. It will have only a zero intersection with $V_j$ for $j \leq n-k$, whereas

$\dim(V_{j} \cap w) = i$ for $j = n-k +i \geq n-k.$

For example, in $\mathbf{Gr}(4,9)$, a $4$-plane $w$ is the solution space of a system of five independent homogeneous linear equations. These equations will generically span when restricted to a subspace $V_j$ with $j=\dim V_j \leq 5=9-4$, in which case the solution space (the intersection of $V_j$ with $w$) will consist only of the zero vector. However, if $\dim(V_j) + \dim(w) > n=9$, $V_j$ and $w$ will necessarily have nonzero intersection. For example, the expected dimension of intersection of $V_6$ and $w$ is $1$, the intersection of $V_7$ and $w$ has expected dimension $2$, and so on.

The definition of a Schubert variety states that the first value of $j$ with $\dim(V_{j} \cap w) \geq i$ is generically smaller than the expected value $n-k +i$ by the parameter $a_i$. The $k$-planes $w \subset V$ given by these constraints then define special subvarieties of $\mathbf{Gr}(k,n)$.

=== Properties ===
==== Inclusion ====
There is a partial ordering on all $k$-tuples where $\mathbf{a} \geq \mathbf{b}$ if $a_i \geq b_i$ for every $i$. This gives the inclusion of Schubert varieties

$$\Sigma_{\mathbf{a}} \subset \Sigma_{\mathbf{b}} \iff \mathbf{a} \geq \mathbf{b},$$

showing an increase of the indices corresponds to an even greater specialization of subvarieties.

==== Dimension formula ====
A Schubert variety $\Sigma_{\mathbf{a}}$ has codimension equal to the weight

$$\mathopen|\mathbf{a}\mathclose|=\sum a_i$$

of the partition $\mathbf{a}$. Alternatively, in the notational convention $S_\lambda$ indicated above, its dimension in $\mathbf{Gr}(k,n)$ is the weight

$$\mathopen|\lambda\mathclose|= \sum_{i=1}^k\lambda_i = k(n-k)-\mathopen|\mathbf{a}\mathclose|.$$

of the complementary partition $\lambda \subset (n-k)^k$ in the $k \times (n-k)$ dimensional rectangular Young diagram.

This is stable under inclusions of Grassmannians. That is, the inclusion

$$i_{(k, n)}:\mathbf{Gr}(k, \mathbf{C}^n)  \hookrightarrow \mathbf{Gr}(k, \mathbf{C}^{n+1}), \quad \mathbf{C}^n =\text{span}\{e_1, \dots, e_n\}$$

defined, for $w\in\mathbf{Gr}(k, \mathbf{C}^n)$, by

$$i_{(k, n)}: w \subset \mathbf{C}^n \mapsto w  \subset \mathbf{C}^n\oplus \mathbf {C} e_{n+1}  =\mathbf{C}^{n+1}$$

has the property

$$i^*_{(k, n)}(\sigma_{\mathbf{a}}) = \sigma_{\mathbf{a}},$$

and the inclusion

$$\tilde{i}_{(k,n)}: \mathbf{Gr}(k,n) \hookrightarrow \mathbf{Gr}(k+1,n+1)$$

defined by adding the extra basis element $e_{n+1}$ to each $k$-plane, giving a $(k+1)$-plane,

$$\tilde{i}_{(k, n)}: w \mapsto w \oplus\mathbf {C} e_{n+1}   \subset \mathbf{C}^n \oplus \mathbf {C} e_{n+1}   =\mathbf{C}^{n+1}$$

does as well

$$\tilde{i}_{(k,n)}^*(\sigma_{\mathbf{a}}) = \sigma_{\mathbf{a}}.$$

Thus, if $X_{\mathbf{a}} \subset \mathbf{Gr}_k(n)$ and $\Sigma_{\mathbf{a}} \subset \mathbf{Gr}_k(n)$ are a cell and a subvariety in the Grassmannian $\mathbf{Gr}_k(n)$, they may also be viewed as a cell $X_{\mathbf{a}} \subset \mathbf{Gr}_\tilde{k}(\tilde{n})$ and a subvariety $\Sigma_{\mathbf{a}} \subset \mathbf{Gr}_\tilde{k}(\tilde{n})$ within the Grassmannian $\mathbf{Gr}_\tilde{k}(\tilde{n})$ for any pair $(\tilde{k}, \tilde{n})$ with $\tilde{k} \geq k$ and $\tilde{n}-\tilde{k} \geq n-k$.

=== Intersection product ===
The intersection product was first established using the Pieri and Giambelli formulas.

==== Pieri formula ====
In the special case $\mathbf{b} = (b,0,\ldots, 0)$, there is an explicit formula of the product of $\sigma_b$ with an arbitrary Schubert class $\sigma_{a_1,\ldots, a_k}$ given by

$$\sigma_b\cdot\sigma_{a_1,\ldots, a_k} = \sum_{
\begin{matrix}\mathopen|c\mathclose| = \mathopen|a\mathclose| + b \\
a_i \leq c_i \leq a_{i-1}
\end{matrix} } \sigma_{\mathbf{c}},$$

where $\mathopen|\mathbf{a}\mathclose| = a_1 + \cdots + a_k$, $|\mathbf{c}| = c_1 + \cdots + c_k$ are the weights of the partitions. This is called the Pieri formula, and can be used to determine the intersection product of any two Schubert classes when combined with the Giambelli formula. For example,

$$\sigma_1 \cdot \sigma_{4,2,1} = \sigma_{5,2,1} + \sigma_{4,3,1} + \sigma_{4,2,1,1}.$$

and

$$\sigma_2 \cdot \sigma_{4,3} = \sigma_{4,3,2} + \sigma_{4,4,1} + \sigma_{5,3,1} + \sigma_{5,4} + \sigma_{6,3}$$

==== Giambelli formula ====
Schubert classes $\sigma_{\mathbf{a}}$ for partitions of any length $\ell(\mathbf{a})\leq k$ can be expressed as the determinant of a $(k \times k)$ matrix having the special classes as entries.

$$\sigma_{(a_1,\ldots, a_k)} = \begin{vmatrix}
\sigma_{a_1} & \sigma_{a_1 + 1} & \sigma_{a_1 + 2} & \cdots & \sigma_{a_1 + k - 1} \\
\sigma_{a_2 - 1} & \sigma_{a_2} & \sigma_{a_2 + 1} & \cdots & \sigma_{a_2 + k - 2} \\
\sigma_{a_3 - 2} & \sigma_{a_3 - 1} & \sigma_{a_3} & \cdots & \sigma_{a_3 + k - 3} \\
\vdots & \vdots & \vdots & \ddots & \vdots \\
\sigma_{a_k - k + 1} & \sigma_{a_k - k + 2} & \sigma_{a_k - k + 3} & \cdots & \sigma_{a_k}
\end{vmatrix}$$

This is known as the Giambelli formula. It has the same form as the first Jacobi-Trudi identity, expressing arbitrary Schur functions $s_{\mathbf{a}}$ as determinants in terms of the complete symmetric functions $\{h_j := s_{(j)}\}$.

For example,

$$\sigma_{2,2} = \begin{vmatrix}
\sigma_2 & \sigma_3 \\
\sigma_1 & \sigma_2
\end{vmatrix} = \sigma_2^2 - \sigma_1\cdot\sigma_3$$

and

$$\sigma_{2,1,1} = \begin{vmatrix}
\sigma_2 & \sigma_3 & \sigma_4 \\
\sigma_0 & \sigma_1 & \sigma_2 \\
0 & \sigma_0 & \sigma_1
\end{vmatrix}.$$

==== General case ====
The intersection product between any pair of Schubert classes $\sigma_{\mathbf{a}}, \sigma_{\mathbf{b}}$ is given by

$$\sigma_{\mathbf{a}} \sigma_{\mathbf{b}} =\sum_{\mathbf{c}}c^\mathbf{c}_{\mathbf{a} \mathbf{b}}\sigma_{\mathbf{c}},$$

where $\{c^\mathbf{c}_{\mathbf{a} \mathbf{b}}\}$ are the Littlewood-Richardson coefficients. The Pieri formula is a special case of this, when $\mathbf{b}=(b,0, \dots, 0)$ has length $\ell(\mathbf{b})=1$.

== Relation with Chern classes ==
There is an easy description of the cohomology ring, or the Chow ring, of the Grassmannian $\mathbf{Gr}(k,V)$ using the Chern classes of two natural vector bundles over $\mathbf{Gr}(k,V)$. We have the exact sequence of vector bundles over $\mathbf{Gr}(k,V)$

$$0 \to T \to \underline{V} \to Q \to 0$$

where $T$ is the tautological bundle whose fiber, over any element $w \in \mathbf{Gr}(k, V)$ is the subspace $w \subset V$ itself, $\, \underline{V}:= \mathbf{Gr}(k,V) \times V$ is the trivial vector bundle of rank $n$, with $V$ as fiber and $Q$ is the quotient vector bundle of rank $n-k$, with $V/w$ as fiber. The Chern classes of the bundles $T$ and $Q$ are

$$c_i(T) = (-1)^i\sigma_{(1)^i},$$

where $(1)^i$ is the partition whose Young diagram consists of a single column of length $i$ and

$$c_i(Q) = \sigma_i.$$

The tautological sequence then gives the presentation of the Chow ring as

$$A^*(\mathbf{Gr}(k,V)) = \frac{\mathbb{Z}[c_1(T), \ldots, c_k(T), c_1(Q),\ldots, c_{n-k}(Q)] }{(c(T)c(Q) - 1)}.$$

== Gr(2,4) ==
One of the classical examples analyzed is the Grassmannian $\mathbf{Gr}(2,4)$ since it parameterizes lines in $\mathbb{P}^3$. Using the Chow ring $A^*(\mathbf{Gr}(2,4))$, Schubert calculus can be used to compute the number of lines on a cubic surface.

=== Chow ring ===
The Chow ring has the presentation

$$A^*(\mathbf{Gr}(2,4)) = \frac{\mathbb{Z}[\sigma_1,\sigma_{1,1}, \sigma_2]}{((1 - \sigma_1 + \sigma_{1,1})(1 + \sigma_1 +  \sigma_2)-1)}$$

and as a graded Abelian group it is given by

$$\begin{align}
A^0(\mathbf{Gr}(2,4)) &= \mathbb{Z}\cdot 1 \\
A^2(\mathbf{Gr}(2,4)) &= \mathbb{Z}\cdot \sigma_1 \\
A^4(\mathbf{Gr}(2,4)) &= \mathbb{Z}\cdot \sigma_2 \oplus \mathbb{Z} \cdot \sigma_{1,1}\\
A^6(\mathbf{Gr}(2,4)) &= \mathbb{Z}\cdot\sigma_{2,1} \\
A^8(\mathbf{Gr}(2,4)) &= \mathbb{Z}\cdot\sigma_{2,2} \\
\end{align}$$

=== Lines on a cubic surface ===
Recall that a line in $\mathbb{P}^3$ gives a dimension $2$ subspace of $\mathbb{A}^4$, hence an element of $\mathbb{G}(1,3) \cong \mathbf{Gr}(2,4)$. Also, the equation of a line can be given as a section of $\Gamma(\mathbb{G}(1,3), T^*)$. Since a cubic surface $X$ is given as a generic homogeneous cubic polynomial, this is given as a generic section $s \in \Gamma(\mathbb{G}(1,3),\text{Sym}^3(T^*))$. A line $L \subset \mathbb{P}^3$ is a subvariety of $X$ if and only if the section vanishes on $[L] \in \mathbb{G}(1,3)$. Therefore, the Euler class of $\text{Sym}^3(T^*)$ can be integrated over $\mathbb{G}(1,3)$ to get the number of points where the generic section vanishes on $\mathbb{G}(1,3)$. In order to get the Euler class, the total Chern class of $T^*$ must be computed, which is given as

$$c(T^*) = 1 + \sigma_1 + \sigma_{1,1}$$

The splitting formula then reads as the formal equation

$$\begin{align}
c(T^*) &= (1 + \alpha)(1 + \beta) \\
&= 1 + \alpha + \beta + \alpha\cdot\beta
\end{align},$$

where $c(\mathcal{L}) = 1+\alpha$ and $c(\mathcal{M}) = 1 + \beta$ for formal line bundles $\mathcal{L},\mathcal{M}$. The splitting equation gives the relations

$\sigma_1 = \alpha + \beta$ and $\sigma_{1,1} = \alpha\cdot\beta$.

Since $\text{Sym}^3(T^*)$ can be viewed as the direct sum of formal line bundles

$$\text{Sym}^{3}(T^{*}) = \mathcal{L}^{\otimes 3} \oplus (\mathcal{L}^{\otimes 2} \otimes \mathcal{M})
\oplus(\mathcal{L}\otimes\mathcal{M}^{\otimes 2})\oplus \mathcal{M}^{\otimes 3}$$

whose total Chern class is

$$c(\text{Sym}^3(T^*)) = (1 + 3\alpha)(1 + 2\alpha + \beta)(1 + \alpha  + 2\beta)(1 + 3\beta),$$

it follows that

$$\begin{align}
c_4(\text{Sym}^3(T^*)) &= 3\alpha (2\alpha + \beta) (\alpha + 2\beta) 3\beta \\
&=9\alpha\beta(2(\alpha + \beta)^2 + \alpha\beta) \\
&= 9\sigma_{1,1}(2\sigma_1^2 + \sigma_{1,1}) \\
&= 27\sigma_{2,2}\, ,
\end{align}$$

using the fact that

$\sigma_{1,1}\cdot \sigma_1^2 = \sigma_{2,1}\sigma_1 = \sigma_{2,2}$ and $\sigma_{1,1}\cdot \sigma_{1,1} = \sigma_{2,2}.$

Since $\sigma_{2,2}$ is the top class, the integral is then

$$\int_{\mathbb{G}(1,3)}27\sigma_{2,2} = 27.$$

Therefore, there are $27$ lines on a cubic surface.

== See also ==
- Enumerative geometry
- Chow ring
- Intersection theory
- Grassmannian
- Giambelli's formula
- Pieri's formula
- Chern class
- Quintic threefold
- Mirror symmetry conjecture
