= Giovanni Giambelli =

Italian mathematician

- Born: June 29, 1879
- Died: December 31, 1953 (aged 74); Messina

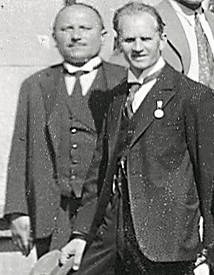
Giovanni Giambelli (left) and Jonas Fjeldstad (right) at the International Congress of Mathematicians, Zürich 1932

Giovanni Zeno Giambelli (June 29, 1879 – December 31, 1953) was an Italian mathematician who is best known for Giambelli's formula.
