= Steven Kleiman =

American mathematician

- Born: Steven Lawrence Kleiman; March 31, 1942 (age 84); Boston, Massachusetts, U.S.
- Education: Massachusetts Institute of Technology, Harvard University
- Scientific career
- Fields: Mathematics
- Workplaces: Massachusetts Institute of Technology
- Doctoral advisor: Oscar Zariski
- Doctoral students: Spencer Bloch; Ranee Brylinski; Susan Jane Colley; George Kempf; Dan Laksov; Ragni Piene; Abramo Hefez

Steven Lawrence Kleiman (born March 31, 1942) is an American mathematician.

== Professional career ==
Kleiman is a professor emeritus of mathematics at the Massachusetts Institute of Technology. Born in Boston, he did his undergraduate studies at MIT. He received his Ph.D. from Harvard University in 1965, after studying there with Oscar Zariski and David Mumford, and joined the MIT faculty in 1969. Kleiman held a prestigious NATO Postdoctoral Fellowship (1966–1967), Sloan Fellowship (1968), and Guggenheim Fellowship (1979).

== Contributions ==
Kleiman is known for his work in algebraic geometry and commutative algebra. He has made seminal contributions in motivic cohomology, moduli theory, intersection theory and enumerative geometry.

== Awards and honors ==
In 1989 the University of Copenhagen awarded him an honorary doctorate and in May 2002 the Norwegian Academy of Science and Letters hosted a conference in honor of his 60th birthday and elected him as a foreign member. In 1992 Kleiman was elected foreign member of the Royal Danish Academy of Sciences and Letters.

In 2012 he became a fellow of the American Mathematical Society. He was an invited speaker at the International Congress of Mathematics at Nice in 1970.

== Selected publications ==
- Kleiman, Steven L. (1966), "Toward a numerical theory of ampleness", Annals of Mathematics, Second Series, 84 (3): 293–344, doi:10.2307/1970447, JSTOR 1970447.
- Kleiman, S. L. (1968), Algebraic cycles and Weil conjectures. Dix exposés sur la cohomologie des schémas, North-Holland, Amsterdam; Masson, Paris, pp. 359–386.
- Altman, I.; Kleiman, Steven L. (1970), Introduction to Grothendieck duality theory, Springer-Verlag.
- Kleiman, Steven L. (1974), "The transversality of a general translate", Compositio Mathematica, 28 (3): 287–297.
- Altman, Allen B.; Kleiman, Steven L. (1980), "Compactifying the Picard scheme", Advances in Mathematics, 35 (1): 50–112, doi:10.1016/0001-8708(80)90043-2.
- Kleiman, Steven; Thorup, Anders L. (1994), "A geometric theory of the Buchsbaum-Rim multiplicity", Journal of Algebra, 167 (1): 168–231, doi:10.1006/jabr.1994.1182.
- Gaffney, T.; Kleiman, Steven L. (1999), "Specialization of integral dependence for modules", Inventiones Mathematicae, 137 (3): 541–574, arXiv:alg-geom/9610003, Bibcode:1999InMat.137..541G, doi:10.1007/s002220050335, S2CID 7215999.

== See also ==
- Cone of curves (Kleiman-Mori cone)
- Kleiman's theorem
