= Plethystic exponential =

In mathematics, the plethystic exponential is a certain operator defined on (formal) power series which, like the usual exponential function, translates addition into multiplication. This exponential operator appears naturally in the theory of symmetric functions, as a concise relation between the generating series for elementary, complete and power sums homogeneous symmetric polynomials in many variables. Its name comes from the operation called plethysm, defined in the context of so-called lambda rings.

In combinatorics, the plethystic exponential is a generating function for many well studied sequences of integers, polynomials or power series, such as the number of integer partitions. It is also an important technique in the enumerative combinatorics of unlabelled graphs, and many other combinatorial objects.

In geometry and topology, the plethystic exponential of a certain geometric/topologic invariant of a space, determines the corresponding invariant of its symmetric products.

The inverse operator of the plethystic exponential is the plethystic logarithm.

== Definition, main properties and basic examples ==
Let $R[[x]]$ be a ring of formal power series in the variable $x$, with coefficients in a commutative ring $R$. Denote by

$$R^0[[x]] \subset R[[x]]$$

the ideal consisting of power series without constant term. Then, given $f(x)\in R^0[[x]]$, its plethystic exponential $\operatorname{PE}[f]$ is given by

$$\operatorname{PE}[f](x)= \exp \left( \sum_{k=1}^\infty \frac{f(x^k)}k \right)$$

where $\exp(\cdot)$ is the usual exponential function. It is readily verified that (writing simply $\operatorname{PE}[f]$ when the variable is understood):

$$\begin{align}[ll]
\operatorname{PE}[0] & = 1\\[5pt]
\operatorname{PE}[f+g] & = \operatorname{PE}[f] \operatorname{PE}[g]\\[5pt]
\operatorname{PE}[-f] & = \operatorname{PE}[f]^{-1}
\end{align}$$

Some basic examples are:

$$\begin{align}[ll]
\operatorname{PE}[x^n] & = \frac1{1-x^n}, n \in \mathbb{N} \\[5pt]
\operatorname{PE}\left[ \frac x{1-x} \right] & =  1+\sum_{n\geq1}p(n)x^n
\end{align}$$

In this last example, $p(n)$ is number of partitions of $n\in\mathbb{N}$.

The plethystic exponential can be also defined for power series rings in many variables.

== Product-sum formula ==
The plethystic exponential can be used to provide innumerous product-sum identities. This is a consequence of a product formula for plethystic exponentials themselves. If $f(x)=\sum_{k=1}^{\infty} a_k x^k$ denotes a formal power series with real coefficients $a_k$, then it is not difficult to show that:
$$\operatorname{PE}[f](x)=\prod_{k=1}^\infty (1-x^k)^{-a_k}$$
The analogous product expression also holds in the many variables case. One particularly interesting case is its relation to integer partitions and to the cycle index of the symmetric group.

== Relation with symmetric functions ==
Working with variables $x_1, x_2, \ldots, x_n$, denote by $h_k$ the complete homogeneous symmetric polynomial, that is the sum of all monomials of degree k in the variables $x_i$, and by $e_k$ the elementary symmetric polynomials. Then, the $h_k$ and the $e_k$ are related to the power sum polynomials: $p_k=x_1^k + \cdots + x_n^k$ by Newton's identities, that can succinctly be written, using plethystic exponentials, as:

$$\sum_{n=0}^\infty h_n \,t^n = \operatorname{PE}[p_1 \,t] = \operatorname{PE}[x_1 t + \cdots + x_n t]$$
$$\sum_{n=0}^\infty (-1)^n e_n \,t^n = \operatorname{PE}[- p_1 \,t] = \operatorname{PE}[-x_1 t - \cdots - x_n t]$$

== Macdonald's formula for symmetric products ==
Let X be a finite CW complex, of dimension d, with Poincaré polynomial
$$P_X (t) = \sum_{k=0}^d b_k(X) \, t^k$$
where $b_k(X)$ is its kth Betti number. Then the Poincaré polynomial of the nth symmetric product of X, denoted $\operatorname{Sym}^n (X)$, is obtained from the series expansion:
$$\operatorname{PE}[P_X(-t)\,x] = \prod_{k=0}^d (1-t^k x)^{(-1)^{k+1}b_k(X)} = \sum_{n\geq 0} P_{\operatorname{Sym}^n(X)}(-t) \, x^n$$

== Plethystic logarithm ==
The inverse of the plethystic exponential is the plethystic logarithm. It is defined in the multivariate case as follows: if $f(x_1, \ldots, x_n)$ is a formal power series (Note: Or a function of n complex arguments.) with constant term 1, then the plethystic logarithm $\operatorname{PL}[f]$ is defined by
$$\operatorname{PL}[f](t_1, t_2, \ldots, t_n) = \sum_{k=1}^\infty \frac{\mu(k)}{k} \ln(f(t_1^k, t_2^k, \ldots, t_n^k)),$$
where $\mu(k)$ is the Möbius function, defined by
$$\mu(k) =
\begin{cases}
1 & \text{if } k = 1, \\
(-1)^n & \text{if } k \text{ is the product of } n \text{ distinct primes}, \\
0 & \text{otherwise},
\end{cases}$$
and ln is the natural logarithm.

== The plethystic programme in physics ==
In a series of articles, a group of theoretical physicists, including Bo Feng, Amihay Hanany and Yang-Hui He, proposed a programme for systematically counting single and multi-trace gauge invariant operators of supersymmetric gauge theories. In the case of quiver gauge theories of D-branes probing Calabi–Yau singularities, this count is codified in the plethystic exponential of the Hilbert series of the singularity.
