= Muirhead's inequality =

Mathematical inequality

In mathematics, Muirhead's inequality, named after Robert Franklin Muirhead, also known as the "bunching" method, generalizes the inequality of arithmetic and geometric means.

== Preliminary definitions ==
=== a-mean ===
For any real vector

$$a=(a_1,\dots,a_n)$$

define the "a-mean" [a] of positive real numbers x_{1}, ..., x_{n} by

$$[a]=\frac{1}{n!}\sum_\sigma x_{\sigma_1}^{a_1}\cdots x_{\sigma_n}^{a_n},$$

where the sum extends over all permutations σ of { 1, ..., n }.

When the elements of a are nonnegative integers, the a-mean can be equivalently defined via the monomial symmetric polynomial $m_a(x_1,\dots,x_n)$ as

$$[a] = \frac{k_1!\cdots k_l!}{n!} m_a(x_1,\dots,x_n),$$

where ℓ is the number of distinct elements in a, and k_{1}, ..., k_{ℓ} are their multiplicities.

Notice that the a-mean as defined above only has the usual properties of a mean (e.g., if the mean of equal numbers is equal to them) if $a_1+\cdots+a_n=1$. In the general case, one can consider instead $[a]^{1/(a_1+\cdots+a_n)}$, which is called a Muirhead mean.

Examples

- For a = (1, 0, ..., 0), the a-mean is just the ordinary arithmetic mean of x_{1}, ..., x_{n}.
- For a = (1/n, ..., 1/n), the a-mean is the geometric mean of x_{1}, ..., x_{n}.
- For a = (x, 1 − x), the a-mean is the Heinz mean.
- The Muirhead mean for a = (−1, 0, ..., 0) is the harmonic mean.

=== Doubly stochastic matrices ===
An n × n matrix P is doubly stochastic precisely if both P and its transpose P^{T} are stochastic matrices. A stochastic matrix is a square matrix of nonnegative real entries in which the sum of the entries in each column is 1. Thus, a doubly stochastic matrix is a square matrix of nonnegative real entries in which the sum of the entries in each row and the sum of the entries in each column is 1.

== Statement ==
Muirhead's inequality states that [a] ≤ [b] for all x such that x_{i} > 0 for every i ∈ { 1, ..., n } if and only if there is some doubly stochastic matrix P for which a = Pb.

Furthermore, in that case we have [a] = [b] if and only if a = b or all x_{i} are equal.

The latter condition can be expressed in several equivalent ways; one of them is given below.

The proof makes use of the fact that every doubly stochastic matrix is a weighted average of permutation matrices (Birkhoff-von Neumann theorem).

=== Another equivalent condition ===
Because of the symmetry of the sum, no generality is lost by sorting the exponents into decreasing order:

$$a_1 \geq a_2 \geq \cdots \geq a_n$$

$$b_1 \geq b_2 \geq \cdots \geq b_n.$$

Then the existence of a doubly stochastic matrix P such that a = Pb is equivalent to the following system of inequalities:

$$\begin{align}
a_1 & \leq b_1 \\
a_1+a_2 & \leq b_1+b_2 \\
a_1+a_2+a_3 & \leq b_1+b_2+b_3 \\
& \,\,\, \vdots \\
a_1+\cdots +a_{n-1} & \leq b_1+\cdots+b_{n-1} \\
a_1+\cdots +a_n & = b_1+\cdots+b_n.
\end{align}$$

(The last one is an equality; the others are weak inequalities.)

The sequence $b_1, \ldots, b_n$ is said to majorize the sequence $a_1, \ldots, a_n$.

== Symmetric sum notation ==
It is convenient to use a special notation for the sums. A success in reducing an inequality in this form means that the only condition for testing it is to verify whether one exponent sequence ($\alpha_1, \ldots, \alpha_n$) majorizes the other one.

$$\sum_\text{sym} x_1^{\alpha_1} \cdots x_n^{\alpha_n}$$

This notation requires developing every permutation, developing an expression made of n! monomials, for instance:

$$\begin{align}
\sum_\text{sym} x^3 y^2 z^0  &= x^3 y^2 z^0 + x^3 z^2 y^0 + y^3 x^2 z^0 + y^3 z^2 x^0 + z^3 x^2 y^0 + z^3 y^2 x^0 \\
&= x^3 y^2  + x^3 z^2  + y^3 x^2 + y^3 z^2  + z^3 x^2  + z^3 y^2
\end{align}$$

== Examples ==
=== Arithmetic-geometric mean inequality ===
Let

$$a_G = \left( \frac 1 n , \ldots ,  \frac 1 n \right)$$

and

$$a_A = ( 1 , 0, 0, \ldots ,  0 ).$$

We have

$$\begin{align}
a_{A1} = 1 & > a_{G1} = \frac 1 n, \\
a_{A1} + a_{A2} = 1 & > a_{G1} + a_{G2} = \frac 2 n, \\
& \,\,\,  \vdots \\
a_{A1} + \cdots + a_{An} & = a_{G1} + \cdots + a_{Gn} = 1.
\end{align}$$

Then

[a_{A}] ≥ [a_{G}],

which is

$$\frac 1 {n!} (x_1^1 \cdot x_2^0 \cdots x_n^0 + \cdots + x_1^0 \cdots x_n^1) (n-1)! \geq \frac 1 {n!} (x_1 \cdot \cdots \cdot x_n)^{1/n} n!$$

yielding the inequality.

=== Other examples ===
We seek to prove that x^{2} + y^{2} ≥ 2xy by using bunching (Muirhead's inequality). We transform it in the symmetric-sum notation:

$$\sum_ \mathrm{sym} x^2 y^0 \ge \sum_\mathrm{sym} x^1 y^1.$$

The sequence (2, 0) majorizes the sequence (1, 1), thus the inequality holds by bunching.

Similarly, we can prove the inequality

$$x^3+y^3+z^3 \ge 3 x y z$$

by writing it using the symmetric-sum notation as

$$\sum_ \mathrm{sym} x^3 y^0 z^0 \ge \sum_\mathrm{sym} x^1 y^1 z^1,$$

which is the same as

$$2 x^3 + 2 y^3 + 2 z^3 \ge 6 x y z.$$

Since the sequence (3, 0, 0) majorizes the sequence (1, 1, 1), the inequality holds by bunching.

== See also ==
- Inequality of arithmetic and geometric means
- Doubly stochastic matrix
- Maclaurin's inequality
- Monomial symmetric polynomial
- Newton's inequalities
