= Newton's identities =

Relations between power sums and elementary symmetric functions

In mathematics, Newton's identities, also known as the Girard–Newton formulae, give relations between two types of symmetric polynomials, namely between power sums and elementary symmetric polynomials. Evaluated at the roots of a monic polynomial P in one variable, they allow expressing the sums of the k-th powers of all roots of P (counted with their multiplicity) in terms of the coefficients of P, without actually finding those roots. These identities were found by Isaac Newton around 1666, apparently in ignorance of earlier work (1629) by Albert Girard. They have applications in many areas of mathematics, including Galois theory, invariant theory, group theory, combinatorics, as well as further applications outside mathematics, including general relativity.

== Statement ==
Newton's identities relate power sums of n variables x_{1}, ..., x_{n} and elementary symmetric polynomials of the same variables.

For integer k, the k-th power sum is
$$p_k=x_1^k + \cdots + x_n^k.$$
This definition is problematic for k ≤ 0 if any of the x_{i} values is zero. Some authors restrict the x_{i} values to be non-zero; the formulas below that have p_{k} for k ≤ 0 assume this convention. Other authors choose to not define p_{k} for any k ≤ 0.

The k-th elementary symmetric polynomial e_{k} is the sum of all $\textstyle\binom{n}{k}$ possible products of k different variables among x_{1}, ..., x_{n}:
$$e_k = \sum_{1 \le i_1 < \ldots < i_k \le n} x_{i_1} x_{i_2} \cdots x_{i_k} = \sum_{1 \le i_1 < \ldots < i_k \le n} \prod_{j=1}^k x_{i_j}$$
In particular,
$$\begin{align}
e_0 &=1,\\
e_1 &= x_1+\cdots + x_n,\\
e_2 &= x_1 x_2 + x_1 x_3 + \cdots + x_{n-1} x_{n},\\
e_n &=x_1\ldots x_n,\\
e_k &=0,\quad \text{for } k>n \text{ or } k<0.
\end{align}$$

Newton's identities express the relationship between the e_{k} and p_{k} values and can be written as
$$\begin{align}
0 &= \sum_{j=0}^{n} (-1)^{j} e_j p_{k-j} \quad \text{or}\\
p_k &= \sum_{j=1}^{n} (-1)^{j-1} e_j p_{k-j}.
\end{align}$$
When the convention that p_{j} is not defined for j ≤ 0 is used these summations are instead truncated at the j = k − 1 term and the remaining terms are replaced with (−1)^{k}ke_{k}:
$$\begin{align}
0 &= (-1)^k k e_k + \sum_{j=0}^{\min(n,k-1)} (-1)^{j} e_j p_{k-j} \quad \text{or}\\
p_k &= (-1)^{k-1} k e_k + \sum_{j=1}^{\min(n,k-1)} (-1)^{j-1} e_j p_{k-j}.
\end{align}$$
Because e_{k} = 0 for k > n this truncated-summation formula captures that the original summations remain unchanged when there is no truncation.

=== Small indexes ===
Newton's identities can be viewed as recurrence relations for expressing the p_{k} as polynomials in the e_{i} only or, conversely, the e_{i} as polynomials in the p_{k} of lower indexes. However, there is no simple general formula for expressing these formulas. For indexes at most four, one has the following formulas.

The first four Newton's identities are
$$\begin{align}
e_1 &= e_0 p_1,\\
2e_2 &= e_1 p_1 - e_0 p_2,\\
3e_3 &= e_2 p_1 - e_1 p_2 + e_0 p_3,\\
4e_4 &= e_3 p_1 - e_2 p_2 + e_1 p_3 - e_0 p_4.
\end{align}$$

Substituting each e_{i} or each p_{k} with the values obtained in the preceding rows, one gets formulae for computing e_{1}, e_{2}, ..., e_{n} from p_{1}, p_{2}, ..., p_{n}:
$$\begin{align}
e_1 &= p_1,\\
2e_2 &= p_1^2-p_2,\\
3e_3 &= \tfrac12 p_1^3-\tfrac32p_1p_2+p_3,\\
4e_4 &= \tfrac16p_1^4 - p_1^2p_2  + \tfrac43p_1p_3+\tfrac12p_2^2-p_4,\\
\end{align}$$
and so on.

Solving for p_{k}, one gets
$$\begin{align}
p_1 &= e_1,\\
p_2 &=  e_1^2 - 2e_2,\\
p_3 &=  e_1^3-3e_1e_2+3e_3,\\
p_4 &= e_1^4-4e_1^2e_2+4e_1e_3+2e_2^2-4e_4.
\end{align}$$

There is no simple closed-form formula for generalizing these formulas to arbitrary indexes. However, closed formulas exist that involve Bell polynomials; see below.

=== Proof when k ≥ n ===
Vieta's formulas express as elementary symmetric functions of x_{1}, ..., x_{n} the coefficients of the polynomial that has x_{1}, ..., x_{n} as polynomial roots. That is,
$$\prod_{i=1}^n (x - x_i) = \sum_{i=0}^n (-1)^i e_i x^{n-i},$$
and, for h = 1, ..., n one has
$$\sum_{i=0}^n (-1)^i e_i x_h^{n-i}=0.$$
Multiplying this equation by $x_h^{k-n}$ and summing over h gives
$$\sum_{i=0}^n (-1)^i e_i p_{k-i}=0,$$
which are Newton's identities whenever $n\le k$.

This proof does not work if $k < n$ when p_{j} is not defined for j ≤ 0. Indeed, in this case, the term of index $k+1$ of the sum is
$$(-1)^{k+1} e_{k+1} \sum_{i=1}^n \frac 1{x_i},$$
which cannot be evaluated in terms of the $p_i$.

=== Proof by a telescopic sum ===
The following proof, is essentially that of Newton. The proof does not depend on the number of variables, which is thus left implicit. The proof may also be formulated in the ring of symmetric functions that formalizes the fact the identities do not depend on the number of variables.

For $1<i\le k$, let $r_k(i)$ be the sum of all monomials of the form
$$x_{\sigma(1)}^i x_{\sigma(2)} \cdots x_{\sigma(k-i)},$$
where $\sigma$ is a permutation of the indices of the variables. In particular, $r_k(k)=p_k$.

One has
$$p_ie_{k-i} =r_k(i+1) +r_k(i),$$
for $1<i<k$. In fact, the left-hand side is the sum of all products of $k-i$ different variables and the $i$th power of another variable; the sum of the products such that the last variable differs from others is $r_k(i)$, and the sum of all other products is $r_k(i)$.

It results that most $r_k(i)$ are cancelled in the alternate sun of the $p_ie_{k-i}$, giving
$$\begin{align}
\sum_{i=1}^{k-1}  (-1)^ip_i e_{k-i} &= -p_1e_{k-1}+r_2 (i) + (-1)^{p-1}r_k(k)\\
&=-p_1e_{k-1}+r_2 (i) + (-1)^{p-1}p_ke_0.
\end{align}$$

One gets
$$p_1e_{k-1} =ke_k+r_k(2)$$
by expanding the product of the left-hand side. By reordering the terms, his gives
$$ke_k=\sum_{i=1}^{k}  (-1)^{i+1}p_i e_{k-i},$$
which is the $k$th Newton's identity.

== Application to the characteristic polynomial of a matrix ==
Newton identities are useful for fast algorithms for computing the characteristic polynomial of a square matrix.

This is based on the following facts:

- The roots of the characteristic polynomial of matrix are its eigenvalues, and their sum is the trace of the matrix.
- The trace of a matrix is the sum of the diagonal entries of the matrix, and thus easy to compute.
- The eigenvalues of a power of a matrix are the corresponding power of the eigenvalues of the matrix.

It follows that the kth power sum of the roots of the characteristic polynomial of a marix A is given by
$$p_k = \operatorname{tr} ( A^k )\,.$$

So, for taking advantage of a fast agorithm for computing matrix povers, one can compute $p_k=\operatorname{tr} ( A^k )$ for $k=1,\ldots,n$, where n is the size of the matrix and the degree of its characteristic polynomial; then, Newton's identities allow computing the elementary symmetric functions of the eigenvalues, which are, up to their sign, the coefficiens of he characteristic polynomial Vieta's formulas).

This computation requires computing the traces of matrix powers $A^k$ and solving a triangular system of equations. Both can be done in omplexity class NC. Therefore, the characteristic polynomial of a matrix can be computed in NC.

Rearranging the computations into an efficient form leads to the Faddeev–LeVerrier algorithm (1840), a fast parallel implementation of it is due to L. Csanky (1976). Its disadvantage is that it requires division by integers, so in general the field should have characteristic 0.

== Related identities ==
There are a number of (families of) identities that, while they should be distinguished from Newton's identities, are very closely related to them.

=== A variant using complete homogeneous symmetric polynomials ===
Denote by h_{k} the complete homogeneous symmetric polynomial; it is the sum of all $\textstyle\binom{n+k-1}{k}$ monomials of degree k:
$$h_k = \sum_{1 \le i_1 \le \ldots \le i_k \le n} x_{i_1} x_{i_2} \cdots x_{i_k} = \sum_{1 \le i_1 \le \ldots \le i_k \le n} \prod_{j=1}^k x_{i_j}.$$
In particular,
$$\begin{align}
h_0 &=1,\\
h_1 &= x_1+\cdots + x_n,\\
h_2 &= x_1 x_1 + x_1 x_2 + x_1 x_3 + \cdots + x_{n-1} x_{n} + x_{n} x_{n}.
\end{align}$$

The power sum polynomials also satisfy identities similar to Newton's identities, but not involving any minus signs. Expressed as identities of in the ring of symmetric functions, they read
$$kh_k = \sum_{i=1}^kh_{k-i}p_i,$$
valid for all k ≥ 1. Contrary to Newton's identities, the left-hand sides do not become zero for large k, and the right-hand sides contain ever more non-zero terms. For the first few values of k, one has
$$\begin{align}
h_1 &= h_0p_1,\\
2h_2 &= h_1p_1 + h_0p_2,\\
3h_3 &= h_2p_1 + h_1p_2 + h_0p_3.\\
\end{align}$$

=== Expressing elementary symmetric polynomials in terms of power sums ===
As mentioned, Newton's identities can be used to recursively express elementary symmetric polynomials in terms of power sums. Doing so requires the introduction of integer denominators, so it can be done in the ring Λ_{Q} of symmetric functions with rational coefficients:
$$\begin{align}
e_1 &= p_1,\\
e_2 &= \textstyle\frac12p_1^2 - \frac12p_2 &&= \textstyle\frac12 ( p_1^2 - p_2 ),\\
e_3 &= \textstyle\frac16p_1^3 - \frac12p_1 p_2 + \frac13p_3 &&= \textstyle\frac{1}{6} ( p_1^3 - 3 p_1 p_2 + 2 p_3 ),\\
e_4 &= \textstyle\frac1{24}p_1^4 - \frac14p_1^2 p_2 + \frac18p_2^2 + \frac13p_1 p_3 - \frac14p_4
&&= \textstyle\frac1{24} ( p_1^4 - 6 p_1^2 p_2 + 3 p_2^2 + 8 p_1 p_3 - 6 p_4 ),\\
&~~\vdots\\
e_n &= (-1)^n  \sum_{m_1 + 2m_2 + \cdots + nm_n = n \atop m_1 \ge 0, \ldots, m_n \ge 0} \prod_{i=1}^n \frac{(-p_i)^{m_i}}{m_i ! \, i^{m_i}} \\
\end{align}$$
and so forth. The general formula can be conveniently expressed as
$$e_k = \frac{(-1)^k}{k!} B_{k}(- p_1, -1! \, p_2, - 2! \, p_3, \ldots,  - (k-1)! \, p_k ),$$
where the B_{n} is the complete exponential Bell polynomial. This expression also leads to the following identity for generating functions:
$$\sum_{k=0}^\infty e_k \,t^k = \exp\left(\sum_{k=1}^\infty \frac{(-1)^{k+1}}{k} p_k \,t^k \right).$$
Applied to a monic polynomial, these formulae express the coefficients in terms of the power sums of the roots: replace each e_{i} by a_{i} and each p_{k} by s_{k}.

=== Expressing complete homogeneous symmetric polynomials in terms of power sums ===
The analogous relations involving complete homogeneous symmetric polynomials can be similarly developed, giving equations
$$\begin{align}
h_1 &= p_1,\\
h_2 &= \textstyle\frac12p_1^2 + \frac12p_2 &&= \textstyle\frac12 ( p_1^2 + p_2 ),\\
h_3 &= \textstyle\frac16p_1^3 + \frac12p_1 p_2 + \frac13p_3 &&= \textstyle\frac{1}{6} ( p_1^3 + 3 p_1 p_2 + 2 p_3 ),\\
h_4 &= \textstyle\frac1{24}p_1^4 + \frac14p_1^2 p_2 + \frac18p_2^2 + \frac13p_1 p_3 + \frac14p_4
&&= \textstyle\frac1{24} ( p_1^4 + 6 p_1^2 p_2 + 3 p_2^2 + 8 p_1 p_3 + 6 p_4 ),\\
&~~\vdots\\
h_k &= \sum_{m_1 + 2m_2 + \cdots + km_k = k \atop m_1\ge 0, \ldots, m_k\ge 0} \prod_{i=1}^k \frac{p_i^{m_i}}{m_i ! \, i^{m_i}}
\end{align}$$
and so forth, in which there are only plus signs. In terms of the complete Bell polynomial,
$$h_k = \frac{1}{k!} B_{k}(p_1, 0! \, p_2, 1! \, p_3, \ldots,  (k-1)! \, p_k ).$$

These expressions correspond exactly to the cycle index polynomials of the symmetric groups, if one interprets the power sums p_{i} as indeterminates: the coefficient in the expression for h_{k} of any monomial p_{1}^{m_{1}}p_{2}^{m_{2}}...p_{l}^{m_{l}} is equal to the fraction of all permutations of k that have m_{1} fixed points, m_{2} cycles of length 2, ..., and m_{l} cycles of length l. Explicitly, this coefficient can be written as $1/N$ where $N = \prod_{i=1}^l (m_i!\,i^{m_i})$; this N is the number permutations commuting with any given permutation π of the given cycle type. The expressions for the elementary symmetric functions have coefficients with the same absolute value, but a sign equal to the sign of π, namely (−1)^{m_{2}+m_{4}+...}.

It can be proved by considering the following inductive step:
$$\begin{align}
mf(m; m_1, \ldots, m_n) &= f(m-1; m_1 - 1, \ldots, m_n) + \cdots + f(m - n; m_1, \ldots, m_n - 1) \\
m_1\prod_{i=1}^n \frac{1}{i^{m_i} m_i!} + \cdots + nm_n \prod_{i=1}^n \frac{1}{i^{m_i} m_i!} &= m\prod_{i=1}^n \frac{1}{i^{m_i} m_i!}
\end{align}$$

By analogy with the derivation of the generating function of the $e_n$, we can also obtain the generating function of the $h_n$, in terms of the power sums, as:
$$\sum_{k=0}^\infty h_k \,t^k = \exp\left(\sum_{k=1}^\infty \frac{p_k}{k} \,t^k \right).$$

This generating function is thus the plethystic exponential of $p_1 t = (x_1 + \cdots + x_n)t$.

=== Expressing power sums in terms of elementary symmetric polynomials ===
One may also use Newton's identities to express power sums in terms of elementary symmetric polynomials, which does not introduce denominators:
$$\begin{align}
p_1 &= e_1,\\
p_2 &= e_1^2 - 2 e_2,\\
p_3 &= e_1^3 - 3 e_2 e_1 + 3 e_3,\\
p_4 &= e_1^4 - 4 e_2 e_1^2 + 4 e_3 e_1 + 2 e_2^2 - 4 e_4,\\
p_5 &= e_1^5 - 5 e_2 e_1^3 + 5 e_3 e_1^2 + 5 e_2^2 e_1 - 5 e_4 e_1 - 5 e_3e_2 + 5 e_5,\\
p_6 &= e_1^6 - 6 e_2 e_1^4 + 6 e_3 e_1^3 + 9 e_2^2 e_1^2 - 6 e_4 e_1^2 - 12 e_3 e_2 e_1 + 6 e_5 e_1 - 2 e_2^3 + 3 e_3^2 + 6 e_4 e_2 - 6e_6.
\end{align}$$

The first four formulas were obtained by Albert Girard in 1629 (thus before Newton).

The general formula (for all positive integers m) is:
$$p_m = (-1)^m m \sum_{r_1 + 2r_2 + \cdots + mr_m = m \atop r_1\ge 0, \ldots, r_m\ge 0} \frac{1}{n}{n \choose r_1\,r_2 \cdots r_m} \prod_{i=1}^m (-e_i)^{r_i}.$$
where n = r_{1} + ... + r_{m} and we are using a multinomial coefficient.

This can be conveniently stated in terms of ordinary Bell polynomials as
$$p_m = (-1)^m m \sum_{k=1}^m \frac{1}{k} \hat{B}_{m,k}(-e_1,\ldots,-e_{m-k+1}),$$
or equivalently as the generating function:
$$\begin{align}
\sum_{k=1}^{\infty} (-1)^{k-1} p_k \frac{t^k}{k} & = \ln\left(1+e_1t+e_2t^2+e_3t^3+\cdots\right) \\
& = e_1 t - \frac{1}{2}\left(e_1^2-2e_2\right) t^2 + \frac{1}{3}\left(e_1^3-3e_1e_2+3e_3\right) t^3 + \cdots,
\end{align}$$
which is analogous to the Bell polynomial exponential generating function given in the previous subsection.

The multiple summation formula above can be proved by considering the following inductive step:
$$\begin{align}
f(m;\; r_1,\ldots,r_n)
= {} & f(m - 1;\; r_1 - 1, \cdots, r_n) + \cdots + f(m - n;\; r_1, \ldots, r_n - 1)\\[8pt]
= {} & \frac{1}{(r_1 - 1)!\cdots r_n!}(m - 1)(r_1 + \cdots + r_n - 2)! + \cdots \\
& \cdots + \frac{1}{r_1!\cdots(r_n - 1)!}(m - n)(r_1 + \cdots + r_n - 2)!\\[8pt]
= {} & \frac{1}{r_1!\cdots r_n!}\left[r_1(m - 1) + \cdots + r_n(m-n)\right]\left[r_1 + \cdots + r_n - 2\right]!\\[8pt]
= {} & \frac{1}{r_1!\cdots r_n!}\left[m(r_1 + \cdots + r_n) - m\right]\left[r_1 + \cdots + r_n - 2\right]!\\[8pt]
= {} & \frac{m(r_1 + \cdots + r_n - 1)!}{r_1!\cdots r_n!}
\end{align}$$

=== Expressing power sums in terms of complete homogeneous symmetric polynomials ===
Finally one may use the variant identities involving complete homogeneous symmetric polynomials similarly to express power sums in term of them:
$$\begin{align}
p_1 &= + h_1,\\
p_2 &= - h_1^2 + 2 h_2,\\
p_3 &= + h_1^3 - 3 h_2 h_1 + 3 h_3,\\
p_4 &= - h_1^4 + 4 h_2 h_1^2 - 4 h_3 h_1 - 2 h_2^2 + 4 h_4,\\
p_5 &= + h_1^5 - 5 h_2 h_1^3 + 5 h_2^2 h_1 + 5 h_3 h_1^2 - 5 h_3h_2 - 5 h_4 h_1 + 5 h_5,\\
p_6 &= - h_1^6 + 6 h_2 h_1^4 - 9 h_2^2 h_1^2 - 6 h_3 h_1^3 + 2 h_2^3 + 12 h_3 h_2 h_1 + 6 h_4 h_1^2 - 3 h_3^2 - 6 h_4 h_2 - 6 h_1 h_5 + 6h_6,\\
\end{align}$$
and so on. Apart from the replacement of each e_{i} by the corresponding h_{i}, the only change with respect to the previous family of identities is in the signs of the terms, which in this case depend just on the number of factors present: the sign of the monomial $\prod_{i=1}^l h_i^{m_i}$ is −(−1)^{m_{1}+m_{2}+m_{3}+...}. In particular the above description of the absolute value of the coefficients applies here as well.

The general formula (for all non-negative integers m) is:
$$p_m = -\sum_{r_1 + 2r_2 + \cdots + mr_m = m \atop r_1\ge 0, \ldots, r_m \ge 0} \frac{m(r_1 + r_2 + \cdots + r_m - 1)!}{r_1!\,r_2!\cdots r_m!} \prod_{i=1}^m (-h_i)^{r_i}$$

=== Expressions as determinants ===
One can obtain explicit formulas for the above expressions in the form of determinants, by considering the first n of Newton's identities (or it counterparts for the complete homogeneous polynomials) as linear equations in which the elementary symmetric functions are known and the power sums are unknowns (or vice versa), and apply Cramer's rule to find the solution for the final unknown. For instance taking Newton's identities in the form
$$\begin{align}
e_1 &= e_0p_1,\\
2e_2 &= e_1p_1 - e_0p_2,\\
3e_3 &= e_2p_1 - e_1p_2 + e_0p_3,\\
& \,\,\,\vdots \\
ne_n &= e_{n-1}p_1 - e_{n-2} p_2 + \cdots + (-1)^ne_1p_{n - 1} + (-1)^{n - 1}p_n
\end{align}$$
we consider $p_1, -p_2, p_3, \ldots, (-1)^np_{n-1}$ and $p_n$ as unknowns, and solve for the final one, giving
$$\begin{align}
(-1)^{n-1}p_n ={} &\begin{vmatrix}
1         &   0    & \cdots &        & e_1 \\
e_1       &   1    & 0      & \cdots & 2e_2 \\
e_2       & e_1    & 1      &        & 3e_3 \\
\vdots    &        & \ddots & \ddots & \vdots\\
e_{n - 1} & \cdots & e_2    & e_1    & ne_n
\end{vmatrix}\begin{vmatrix}
1     & 0      & \cdots & \\
e_1     & 1      & 0      & \cdots  \\
e_2     & e_1    & 1      & \\
\vdots    &        & \ddots & \ddots \\
e_{n - 1} & \cdots & e_2 & e_1 & 1
\end{vmatrix}^{-1} \\[7pt]
p_n = {(-1)^{n-1}} &\begin{vmatrix}
1         & 0      & \cdots &        & e_1 \\
e_1       & 1      & 0      & \cdots & 2e_2 \\
e_2       & e_1    & 1      &        & 3e_3 \\
\vdots    &        & \ddots &\ddots  & \vdots \\
e_{n - 1} & \cdots & e_2    & e_1    & ne_n
\end{vmatrix} \\[7pt]
={} &\begin{vmatrix}
e_1    & 1         & 0      & \cdots          \\
2e_2   & e_1       & 1      & 0      & \cdots \\
3e_3   & e_2       & e_1    & 1               \\
\vdots &           &        & \ddots & \ddots \\
ne_n   & e_{n - 1} & \cdots &        & e_1
\end{vmatrix}.
\end{align}$$

Solving for $e_n$ instead of for $p_n$ is similar, as the analogous computations for the complete homogeneous symmetric polynomials; in each case the details are slightly messier than the final results, which are (Macdonald 1979, p. 20):
$$\begin{align}
e_n = \frac1{n!}&\begin{vmatrix}
p_1     & 1       & 0      & \cdots       \\
p_2     & p_1     & 2      & 0      & \cdots \\
\vdots  &         & \ddots & \ddots       \\
p_{n-1} & p_{n-2} & \cdots & p_1    & n-1 \\
p_n     & p_{n-1} & \cdots & p_2    & p_1
\end{vmatrix} \\[7pt]
p_n  = (-1)^{n-1}&\begin{vmatrix}
h_1    & 1       & 0      & \cdots          \\
2h_2   & h_1     & 1      & 0      & \cdots \\
3h_3   & h_2     & h_1    & 1               \\
\vdots &         &        & \ddots & \ddots  \\
nh_n   & h_{n-1} & \cdots &        & h_1
\end{vmatrix} \\[7pt]
h_n = \frac1{n!}&\begin{vmatrix}
p_1       & -1      & 0      & \cdots         \\
p_2       & p_1     & -2     & 0      & \cdots \\
\vdots    &         & \ddots & \ddots         \\
p_{n - 1} & p_{n-2} & \cdots & p_1    & 1 - n \\
p_n       & p_{n-1} & \cdots & p_2    & p_1
\end{vmatrix}.
\end{align}$$

Note that the use of determinants makes that the formula for $h_n$ has additional minus signs compared to the one for $e_n$, while the situation for the expanded form given earlier is opposite. As remarked in (Littlewood 1950, p. 84) one can alternatively obtain the formula for $h_n$ by taking the permanent of the matrix for $e_n$ instead of the determinant, and more generally an expression for any Schur polynomial can be obtained by taking the corresponding immanant of this matrix.

== Derivation of the identities ==
Each of Newton's identities can easily be checked by elementary algebra; however, their validity in general needs a proof. Here are some possible derivations.

=== Proofs via generating functions ===
We can show the relationships between e_{k}, p_{k}, and h_{k} via the generating functions
$$\begin{align}
E(t) &= \sum_{k=0}^{n} (-1)^k e_k(x_1, \ldots, x_n) t^k = \prod_{j=1}^n (1 - x_j t) \\
P(t) &= \sum_{k=1}^{\infty} p_k(x_1, \ldots, x_n) t^k = \sum_{j=1}^n \left( x_j t + (x_j t)^2 + \ldots \right) = \sum_{j=1}^n \frac{x_j t}{1 - x_j t} \\
H(t) &= \sum_{k=0}^{\infty} h_k(x_1, \ldots, x_n) t^k = \prod_{j=1}^n \left( 1 + x_j t + (x_j t)^2 + \ldots \right) = \prod_{j=1}^n \frac{1}{1 - x_j t}\,.
\end{align}$$
Note that we are using the convention that p_{k} is not defined when k ≤ 0.

==== E and H ====
Equality of the coefficient of t^{k} on each side of the equation E(t)H(t) = 1 gives us that
$$\sum_{j=0}^{\min(n,k)} (-1)^j e_j h_{k-j} = \delta_{k0}\,,$$
for any k ≥ 0, where we take advantage of the fact that e_{j} = 0 for j > n, and where δ_{k0} is the Kronecker delta function, which is 1 when k = 0 and is 0 otherwise. That is, the sum on the left hand side equals zero except in the trivial case that k = 0.

==== E and P ====
The equation
$$\frac{1}{E(t)} \frac{dE(t)}{dt}
= \frac{d}{dt} \ln E(t)
= \sum_{j=1}^n \frac{d}{dt} \ln (1 - x_j t)
= \sum_{j=1}^n \frac{-x_j}{1 - x_j t}
= -\frac{P(t)}{t}$$
gives us
$$-t \frac{dE(t)}{dt} = P(t) E(t)\,,$$
and equality of the coefficient of t^{k} on each side of that equation gives
$$(-1)^{k+1} k e_k = \sum_{j=0}^{\min(n,k-1)} (-1)^j e_j p_{k-j}$$
for any k ≥ 0.

Another relationship can be found by repeatedly differentiating the right-hand side of the equation
$$P(t) = - t \frac{1}{E(t)} \frac{dE(t)}{dt}$$
to get its Taylor series around t = 0; its k-th term equals p_{k}.

==== H and P ====
Plugging
$$\frac{1}{H(t)} \frac{dH(t)}{dt} = -\frac{1}{E(t)} \frac{dE(t)}{dt}$$
into the relationship between E(t) and P(t) gives
$$t \frac{dH(t)}{dt} = P(t) H(t)\,,$$
and equality of the coefficient of t^{k} on each side of that equation gives
$$k h_k = \sum_{j=0}^{k-1} h_j p_{k-j}$$
for any k ≥ 0.

=== Combinatorial proof ===
A short combinatorial proof of Newton's identities was given by Doron Zeilberger in 1984.

== See also ==
- Power sum symmetric polynomial
- Elementary symmetric polynomial
- Newton's inequalities
- Symmetric function
- Fluid solutions, an article giving an application of Newton's identities to computing the characteristic polynomial of the Einstein tensor in the case of a perfect fluid, and similar articles on other types of exact solutions in general relativity.
