= Binomial ring =

In mathematics, a binomial ring is a commutative ring whose additive group is torsion-free and contains all binomial coefficients

$$\binom{x}{n} = \frac{x(x-1)\cdots(x-n+1)}{n!}$$

for x in the ring and n a positive integer. Binomial rings were introduced by Hall (1969).

Elliott (2006) showed that binomial rings are essentially the same as λ-rings for which all Adams operations are the identity.
