= Representation ring =

In mathematics, especially in the area of algebra known as representation theory, the representation ring (or Green ring after J. A. Green) of a group is a ring formed from all the (isomorphism classes of the) finite-dimensional linear representations of the group. Elements of the representation ring are sometimes called virtual representations. For a given group, the ring will depend on the base field of the representations. The case of complex coefficients is the most developed, but the case of algebraically closed fields of characteristic p where the Sylow p-subgroups are cyclic is also theoretically approachable.

== Formal definition ==
Given a group G and a field F, the elements of its representation ring R_{F}(G) are the formal differences of isomorphism classes of finite-dimensional F-representations of G. For the ring structure, addition is given by the direct sum of representations, and multiplication by their tensor product over F. When F is omitted from the notation, as in R(G), then F is implicitly taken to be the field of complex numbers.

The representation ring of G is the Grothendieck ring of the category of finite-dimensional representations of G.

== Examples ==
- For the complex representations of the cyclic group of order n, the representation ring R_{C}(C_{n}) is isomorphic to Z[X]/(X^{n} − 1), where X corresponds to the complex representation sending a generator of the group to a primitive nth root of unity.
- More generally, the complex representation ring of a finite abelian group may be identified with the group ring of the character group.
- For the rational representations of the cyclic group of order 3, the representation ring R_{Q}(C_{3}) is isomorphic to Z[X]/(X^{2} − X − 2), where X corresponds to the irreducible rational representation of dimension 2.
- For the modular representations of the cyclic group of order 3 over a field F of characteristic 3, the representation ring R_{F}(C_{3}) is isomorphic to Z[X,Y]/(X^{2} − Y − 1, XY − 2Y,Y^{2} − 3Y).
- The continuous representation ring R(S^{1}) for the circle group is isomorphic to Z[X, X^{−1}]. The ring of real representations is the subring of R(G) of elements fixed by the involution on R(G) given by X ↦ X^{−1}.
- The ring R_{C}(S_{3}) for the symmetric group of degree three is isomorphic to Z[X,Y]/(XY − Y,X^{2} − 1,Y^{2} − X − Y − 1), where X is the 1-dimensional alternating representation and Y the 2-dimensional irreducible representation of S_{3}.

== Characters ==
Any finite-dimensional complex representation ρ of a group G defines a function χ:G → $\mathbb{C}$ by the formula χ(g) = tr(ρ(g)). Such a function is a so-called class function, meaning that it is constant on each conjugacy class of G. Denote the ring of complex-valued class functions by C(G). The map sending isomorphism classes of representations to their characters gives a homomorphism R(G) → C(G), and when G is finite this is injective, so that R(G) can be identified with a subring of C(G).

In the case of finite groups this ring homomorphism R(G) → C(G) extends to an algebra isomorphism $\mathbb{C} \otimes_{\mathbb{Z}}$ R(G) → C(G). Since isomorphism classes of irreducible representations of a finite group form a basis of $\mathbb{C} \otimes_{\mathbb{Z}}$R(G), while characteristic functions of conjugacy classes form a basis of C(G), this shows that a finite group has as many isomorphism classes of irreducible representations as it has conjugacy classes.

For a compact connected Lie group, R(G) is isomorphic to the subring of R(T) (where T is a maximal torus) consisting of those class functions that are invariant under the action of the Weyl group (Atiyah and Hirzebruch, 1961). For the general compact Lie group, see Segal (1968).

== λ-ring and Adams operations ==
Given a representation of G and a natural number n, we can form the n-th exterior power of the representation, which is again a representation of G. This induces an operation λ^{n} : R(G) → R(G). With these operations, R(G) becomes a λ-ring.

The Adams operations on the representation ring R(G) are maps Ψ^{k} characterised by their effect on characters χ:

$$\Psi^k \chi (g) = \chi(g^k) \ .$$

The operations Ψ^{k} are ring homomorphisms of R(G) to itself, and on representations ρ of dimension d

$$\Psi^k (\rho) = N_k(\Lambda^1\rho,\Lambda^2\rho,\ldots,\Lambda^d\rho) \$$

where the Λ^{i}ρ are the exterior powers of ρ and N_{k} is the k-th power sum expressed as a function of the d elementary symmetric functions of d variables.
