= Λ-ring =

In algebra, a λ-ring or lambda ring is a commutative ring together with some operations λ^{n} on it that behave like the exterior powers of vector spaces. Many rings considered in K-theory carry a natural λ-ring structure. λ-rings also provide a powerful formalism for studying an action of the symmetric functions on the ring of polynomials, recovering and extending many classical results (Lascoux (2003)).

λ-rings were introduced by Grothendieck (1957, 1958, p.148). For more about λ-rings see Atiyah & Tall (1969), Knutson (1973), Hazewinkel (2009) and Yau (2010).

== Motivation ==
If V and W are finite-dimensional vector spaces over a field k, then we can form the direct sum V ⊕W, the tensor product V ⊗W, and the n-th exterior power of V, Λ^{n}(V). All of these are again finite-dimensional vector spaces over k. The same three operations of direct sum, tensor product and exterior power are also available when working with k-linear representations of a finite group, when working with vector bundles over some topological space, and in more general situations.

λ-rings are designed to abstract the common algebraic properties of these three operations, where we also allow for formal inverses with respect to the direct sum operation. (These formal inverses also appear in Grothendieck groups, which is why the underlying additive groups of most λ-rings are Grothendieck groups.) The addition in the ring corresponds to the direct sum, the multiplication in the ring corresponds to the tensor product, and the λ-operations to the exterior powers. For example, the isomorphism

$$\Lambda^2(V\oplus W)\cong \Lambda^2(V)\oplus\left(\Lambda^1(V)\otimes\Lambda^1(W)\right)\oplus\Lambda^2(W)$$

corresponds to the formula

$$\lambda^2(x+y)=\lambda^2(x)+\lambda^1(x)\lambda^1(y)+\lambda^2(y)$$

valid in all λ-rings, and the isomorphism

$$\Lambda^1(V\otimes W)\cong \Lambda^1(V)\otimes\Lambda^1(W)$$

corresponds to the formula

$$\lambda^1(xy)=\lambda^1(x)\lambda^1(y)$$

valid in all λ-rings. Analogous but (much) more complicated formulas govern the higher order λ-operators.

=== Motivation with Vector Bundles ===
If we have a short exact sequence of vector bundles over a smooth scheme $X$

$0 \to \mathcal{E}'' \to \mathcal{E} \to \mathcal{E}' \to 0,$

then locally, for a small enough open neighborhood $U$ we have the isomorphism

$$\bigwedge^n \mathcal{E}|_U \cong \bigoplus_{i+j=n} \bigwedge^i \mathcal{E}'|_U \otimes\bigwedge^j\mathcal{E}''|_U$$

Now, in the Grothendieck group $K(X)$ of $X$ (which is actually a ring), we get this local equation globally for free, from the defining equivalence relations. So

$$\begin{align}
\left[\bigwedge^n \mathcal{E} \right] &= \left[\bigoplus_{i+j=n} \bigwedge^i \mathcal{E}' \otimes\bigwedge^j\mathcal{E}''\right]
\\ &= \sum_{i+j = n} \left[ \bigwedge^i \mathcal{E}' \right]\cdot \left[ \bigwedge^j \mathcal{E}'' \right]
\end{align}$$

demonstrating the basic relation in a λ-ring, that

$$\lambda^n(x+y) = \sum_{i+j=n}\lambda^i(x)\lambda^j(y).$$

== Definition ==
A λ-ring is a commutative ring R together with operations λ^{n} : R → R for every non-negative integer n. These operations are required to have the following properties valid for all x, y in R and all n, m ≥ 0:

- λ^{0}(x) = 1
- λ^{1}(x) = x
- λ^{n}(1) = 0 if n ≥ 2
- λ^{n}(x + y) = Σ_{i+j=n} λ^{i}(x)λ^{j}(y)
- λ^{n}(xy) = P_{n}(λ^{1}(x), ..., λ^{n}(x), λ^{1}(y), ..., λ^{n}(y))
- λ^{n}(λ^{m}(x)) = P_{n,m}(λ^{1}(x), ..., λ^{mn}(x))

where P_{n} and P_{n,m} are certain universal polynomials with integer coefficients that describe the behavior of exterior powers on tensor products and under composition. These polynomials can be defined as follows.

Let e_{1}, ..., e_{mn} be the elementary symmetric polynomials in the variables X_{1}, ..., X_{mn}. Then P_{n,m} is the unique polynomial in nm variables with integer coefficients such that P_{n,m}(e_{1}, ..., e_{mn}) is the coefficient of t^{n} in the expression

$\prod_{1 \le i_1<i_2<\cdots<i_m\le mn} (1+tX_{i_1}X_{i_2}\cdots X_{i_m})$

(Such a polynomial exists, because the expression is symmetric in the X_{i} and the elementary symmetric polynomials generate all symmetric polynomials.)

Now let e_{1}, ..., e_{n} be the elementary symmetric polynomials in the variables X_{1}, ..., X_{n} and f_{1}, ..., f_{n} be the elementary symmetric polynomials in the variables Y_{1}, ..., Y_{n}. Then P_{n} is the unique polynomial in 2n variables with integer coefficients such that P_{n}(e_{1}, ..., e_{n}, f_{1}, ..., f_{n}) is the coefficient of t^{n} in the expression

$$\prod_{i,j=1}^n (1+tX_iY_j)$$

== Plethystic formulation ==
A λ-ring is a commutative ring $R$ equipped with a map (Getzler (1995))

$$\Lambda\times R\to R,\qquad (f,x)\mapsto f\circ x=f[x],$$

called plethysm, satisfying the following axioms for all $x,y\in R$:

1. The map $\Lambda\to R,\, f\mapsto f[x]$, is a ring homomorphism.
2. $e_1[x]=x$.
3. $e_n[x+y]=\sum\nolimits_{i+j=n} e_i[x]\cdot e_j[y]$ for $n\ge0$.
4. $e_n[1]=0$ for $n\ge 2$.
5. $f\circ (g\circ x)=(f\circ g)\circ x$ for $f,g\in\Lambda$.

Here $\Lambda$ is the ring of symmetric functions, $e_n\in\Lambda$ are the elementary symmetric functions, and the plethysm on $\Lambda$ is defined by $p_n\circ f = f(x_1^n,x_2^n,\dots)$ for $f\in\Lambda$ and power sum symmetric functions $p_n=\sum\nolimits_{i\ge 1}x_i^n$. The original definition of a λ-ring is obtained by setting $\lambda^n=e_n[-]:R\to R$. The maps $\psi^n=p_n[-]:R\to R$ are ring homomorphisms, called Adams operations. The first three axioms define a pre-λ-ring.

=== Variations ===
The λ-rings defined above are called "special λ-rings" by some authors, who use the term "λ-ring" for a more general concept where the conditions on λ^{n}(1), λ^{n}(xy) and λ^{n}(λ^{m}(x)) are dropped.

== Examples ==
- The ring Z of integers, with the binomial coefficients $\lambda^n(x)={x\choose n}$ as operations (which are also defined for negative x) is a λ-ring. In fact, this is the only λ-structure on Z. This example is closely related to the case of finite-dimensional vector spaces mentioned in the Motivation section above, identifying each vector space with its dimension and remembering that $\dim(\Lambda^n(k^x ))={x\choose n}$.
- More generally, any binomial ring becomes a λ-ring if we define the λ-operations to be the binomial coefficients, λ^{n}(x) = (^{x}_{n}). In these λ-rings, all Adams operations are the identity.
- The K-theory K(X) of a topological space X is a λ-ring, with the lambda operations induced by taking exterior powers of a vector bundle.
- Given a group G and a base field k, the representation ring R(G) is a λ-ring; the λ-operations are induced by the exterior powers of k-linear representations of the group G.
- The ring Λ_{Z} of symmetric functions is a λ-ring. On the integer coefficients the λ-operations are defined by binomial coefficients as above, and if e_{1}, e_{2}, ... denote the elementary symmetric functions, we set λ^{n}(e_{1}) = e_{n}. Using the axioms for the λ-operations, and the fact that the functions e_{k} are algebraically independent and generate the ring Λ_{Z}, this definition can be extended in a unique fashion so as to turn Λ_{Z} into a λ-ring. In fact, this is the free λ-ring on one generator, the generator being e_{1}. (Yau (2010, p.14)).
- The Grothendieck group of any Cauchy-complete k-linear category (with k of characteristic 0) is a λ-ring, generalizing many of the examples above. In fact, this example is universal in a precise sense.

== Further properties and definitions ==
Every λ-ring has characteristic 0 and contains the λ-ring Z as a λ-subring.

Many notions of commutative algebra can be extended to λ-rings. For example, a λ-homomorphism between λ-rings R and S is a ring homomorphism f : R → S such that f(λ^{n}(x)) = λ^{n}(f(x)) for all x in R and all n ≥ 0. A λ-ideal in the λ-ring R is an ideal I in R such that λ^{n}(x) ϵ I for all x in R and all n ≥ 1.

If x is an element of a λ-ring and m a non-negative integer such that λ^{m}(x) ≠ 0 and λ^{n}(x) = 0 for all n > m, we write dim(x) = m and call the element x finite-dimensional. Not all elements need to be finite-dimensional. We have dim(x+y) ≤ dim(x) + dim(y) and the product of 1-dimensional elements is 1-dimensional.

Symmetric functions act on λ-rings, as follows: given a symmetric polynomial p in arbitrary many variables with integer coefficients, and an element x of a λ-ring R, there exists a unique λ-homomorphism f : Λ_{Z} → R with f(e_{1})=x, and we set p.x := f(p).

== See also ==
- Chern class
- Symmetric Function
- K-theory
- Adams operation
- Plethystic exponential
