= Complete homogeneous symmetric polynomial =

Expression in commutative algebra

In mathematics, specifically in algebraic combinatorics and commutative algebra, the complete homogeneous symmetric polynomials are a specific kind of symmetric polynomials. Every symmetric polynomial can be expressed as a polynomial expression in complete homogeneous symmetric polynomials.

== Definition ==
The complete homogeneous symmetric polynomial of degree k in n variables X_{1}, ..., X_{n}, written h_{k} for k = 0, 1, 2, ..., is the sum of all monomials of total degree k in the variables. Formally,

$$h_k (X_1, X_2, \dots,X_n) = \sum_{1 \leq i_1 \leq i_2 \leq \cdots \leq i_k \leq n} X_{i_1} X_{i_2} \cdots X_{i_k}.$$

The formula can also be written as:

$$h_k (X_1, X_2, \dots,X_n) = \sum_{l_1+l_2+ \cdots + l_n=k \atop l_i \geq 0 } X_{1}^{l_1} X_{2}^{l_2} \cdots X_{n}^{l_n}.$$

Indeed, l_{p} is just the multiplicity of p in the sequence i_{k}.

The first few of these polynomials are

$$\begin{align}
h_0 (X_1, X_2, \dots,X_n) &= 1, \\[10px]
h_1 (X_1, X_2, \dots,X_n) &= \sum_{1 \leq j \leq n} X_j, \\
h_2 (X_1, X_2, \dots,X_n) &= \sum_{1 \leq j \leq k \leq n} X_j X_k, \\
h_3 (X_1, X_2, \dots,X_n) &= \sum_{1 \leq j \leq k \leq l \leq n} X_j X_k X_l.
\end{align}$$

Another way of rewriting the definition is to take summation over all sequences i_{k}, without condition of ordering i_{p} ≤ i_{p + 1}:

$$h_k (X_1, X_2, \dots, X_n) = \sum_{1 \leq i_1, i_2 , \cdots , i_k \leq n} \frac{m_1! m_2 !\cdots m_n!}{k!} X_{i_1} X_{i_2} \cdots X_{i_k},$$

here m_{p} is the multiplicity of number p in the sequence i_{k}. This can more simply be thought of as a Multinomial Expansion with no coefficients greater than $1$

For example

$$h_2 (X_1, X_2) = \frac{2!0!}{2!}X_1^2 +\frac{1!1!}{2!}X_1X_2 +\frac{1!1!}{2!}X_2X_1 +  \frac{0!2!}{2!}X_2^2 = X_1^2+X_1X_2+X_2^2.$$

The polynomial ring formed by taking all integral linear combinations of products of the complete homogeneous symmetric polynomials is a commutative ring.

== Examples ==
The following lists the n basic (as explained below) complete homogeneous symmetric polynomials for the first three positive values of n.

For n = 1:

$$h_1(X_1) = X_1\,.$$

For n = 2:

$$\begin{align}
h_1(X_1,X_2)&= X_1 + X_2\\
h_2(X_1,X_2)&= X_1^2 + X_1X_2 + X_2^2.
\end{align}$$

For n = 3:

$$\begin{align}
h_1(X_1,X_2,X_3) &= X_1 + X_2 + X_3\\
h_2(X_1,X_2,X_3) &= X_1^2 + X_2^2 + X_3^2 + X_1X_2 + X_1X_3 + X_2X_3\\
h_3(X_1,X_2,X_3) &= X_1^3+X_2^3+X_3^3 + X_1^2X_2+X_1^2X_3+X_2^2X_1+X_2^2X_3+X_3^2X_1+X_3^2X_2 + X_1X_2X_3.
\end{align}$$

== Properties ==
=== Generating function ===
The complete homogeneous symmetric polynomials are characterized by the following identity of formal power series in t:

$$\sum_{k=0}^\infty h_k(X_1,\ldots,X_n)t^k = \prod_{i=1}^n\sum_{j=0}^\infty(X_it)^j = \prod_{i=1}^n\frac1{1-X_it}$$

(this is called the generating function, or generating series, for the complete homogeneous symmetric polynomials). Here each fraction in the final expression is the usual way to represent the formal geometric series that is a factor in the middle expression. The identity can be justified by considering how the product of those geometric series is formed: each factor in the product is obtained by multiplying together one term chosen from each geometric series, and every monomial in the variables X_{i} is obtained for exactly one such choice of terms, and comes multiplied by a power of t equal to the degree of the monomial.

The formula above can be seen as a special case of the MacMahon master theorem. The right hand side can be interpreted as $1/\!\det(1-tM)$ where $t \in \mathbb{R}$ and $M = \text{diag}(X_1, \ldots, X_N)$. On the left hand side, one can identify the complete homogeneous symmetric polynomials as special cases of the multinomial coefficient that appears in the MacMahon expression.

Performing some standard computations, we can also write the generating function as
$$\sum_{k=0}^\infty h_k(X_1,\ldots,X_n)\, t^k = \exp \left( \sum_{j=1}^\infty (X_1^j+\cdots+X_n^j) \frac{t^j}j \right)$$
which is the power series expansion of the plethystic exponential of $(X_1+\cdots +X_n)t$ (and note that $p_j:=X_1^j+\cdots+X_n^j$ is precisely the j-th power sum symmetric polynomial).

=== Relation with the elementary symmetric polynomials ===
There is a fundamental relation between the elementary symmetric polynomials and the complete homogeneous ones:

$$\sum_{i=0}^m(-1)^ie_i(X_1,\ldots,X_n)h_{m-i}(X_1,\ldots,X_n)=0,$$

which is valid for all m > 0, and any number of variables n. The easiest way to see that it holds is from an identity of formal power series in t for the elementary symmetric polynomials, analogous to the one given above for the complete homogeneous ones, which can also be written in terms of plethystic exponentials as:

$$\sum_{k=0}^\infty e_k(X_1,\ldots,X_n)(-t)^k = \prod_{i=1}^n(1-X_it) = PE[-(X_1+\cdots+X_n)t]$$

(this is actually an identity of polynomials in t, because after e_{n}(X_{1}, ..., X_{n}) the elementary symmetric polynomials become zero). Multiplying this by the generating function for the complete homogeneous symmetric polynomials, one obtains the constant series 1 (equivalently, plethystic exponentials satisfy the usual properties of an exponential), and the relation between the elementary and complete homogeneous polynomials follows from comparing coefficients of t^{m}. A somewhat more direct way to understand that relation is to consider the contributions in the summation involving a fixed monomial X^{α} of degree m. For any subset S of the variables appearing with nonzero exponent in the monomial, there is a contribution involving the product X_{S} of those variables as term from e_{s}(X_{1}, ..., X_{n}), where s = #S, and the monomial X^{α}/X_{S} from h_{m − s}(X_{1}, ..., X_{n}); this contribution has coefficient (−1)^{s}. The relation then follows from the fact that

$$\sum_{s=0}^l\binom{l}{s}(-1)^s=(1-1)^l=0\quad\mbox{for }l>0,$$

by the binomial formula, where l < m denotes the number of distinct variables occurring (with nonzero exponent) in X^{α}. Since e_{0}(X_{1}, ..., X_{n}) and h_{0}(X_{1}, ..., X_{n}) are both equal to 1, one can isolate from the relation either the first or the last terms of the summation. The former gives a sequence of equations:

$$\begin{align}
h_1(X_1,\ldots,X_n)&=e_1(X_1,\ldots,X_n),\\
h_2(X_1,\ldots,X_n)&=h_1(X_1,\ldots,X_n)e_1(X_1,\ldots,X_n)-e_2(X_1,\ldots,X_n),\\
h_3(X_1,\ldots,X_n)&=h_2(X_1,\ldots,X_n)e_1(X_1,\ldots,X_n)-h_1(X_1,\ldots,X_n)e_2(X_1,\ldots,X_n)+e_3(X_1,\ldots,X_n),\\
\end{align}$$

and so on, that allows to recursively express the successive complete homogeneous symmetric polynomials in terms of the elementary symmetric polynomials; the latter gives a set of equations

$$\begin{align}
e_1(X_1,\ldots,X_n)&=h_1(X_1,\ldots,X_n),\\
e_2(X_1,\ldots,X_n)&=h_1(X_1,\ldots,X_n)e_1(X_1,\ldots,X_n)-h_2(X_1,\ldots,X_n),\\
e_3(X_1,\ldots,X_n)&=h_1(X_1,\ldots,X_n)e_2(X_1,\ldots,X_n)-h_2(X_1,\ldots,X_n)e_1(X_1,\ldots,X_n)+h_3(X_1,\ldots,X_n),\\
\end{align}$$

and so forth, that allows doing the inverse. The first n elementary and complete homogeneous symmetric polynomials play perfectly similar roles in these relations, even though the former polynomials then become zero, whereas the latter do not. This phenomenon can be understood in the setting of the ring of symmetric functions. It has a ring automorphism that interchanges the sequences of the n elementary and first n complete homogeneous symmetric functions.

The set of complete homogeneous symmetric polynomials of degree 1 to n in n variables generates the ring of symmetric polynomials in n variables. More specifically, the ring of symmetric polynomials with integer coefficients equals the integral polynomial ring

$$\mathbb Z\big[h_1(X_1,\ldots,X_n),\ldots,h_n(X_1,\ldots,X_n)\big].$$

This can be formulated by saying that

$$h_1(X_1,\ldots,X_n),\ldots,h_n(X_1,\ldots,X_n)$$

form a transcendence basis of the ring of symmetric polynomials in X_{1}, ..., X_{n} with integral coefficients (as is also true for the elementary symmetric polynomials). The same is true with the ring $\mathbb{Z}$ of integers replaced by any other commutative ring. These statements follow from analogous statements for the elementary symmetric polynomials, due to the indicated possibility of expressing either kind of symmetric polynomials in terms of the other kind.

=== Relation with the Stirling numbers ===
The evaluation at integers of complete homogeneous polynomials and elementary symmetric polynomials is related to Stirling numbers:

$$\begin{align}
h_n(1,2,\ldots,k)&= \left\{\begin{matrix} n+k \\ k \end{matrix}\right\}\\
e_n(1,2,\ldots,k)&=\left[{k+1 \atop k+1-n}\right]\\
\end{align}$$

=== Relation with the monomial symmetric polynomials ===
The polynomial h_{k}(X_{1}, ..., X_{n}) is also the sum of all distinct monomial symmetric polynomials of degree k in X_{1}, ..., X_{n}, for instance

$$\begin{align}
h_3(X_1,X_2,X_3)&=m_{(3)}(X_1,X_2,X_3)+m_{(2,1)}(X_1,X_2,X_3)+m_{(1,1,1)}(X_1,X_2,X_3)\\
&=\left(X_1^3+X_2^3+X_3^3\right)+\left(X_1^2X_2+X_1^2X_3+X_1X_2^2+X_1X_3^2+X_2^2X_3+X_2X_3^2\right)+(X_1X_2X_3).\\
\end{align}$$

=== Relation with power sums ===
Newton's identities for homogeneous symmetric polynomials give the simple recursive formula

$$kh_k = \sum_{i=1}^kh_{k-i}p_i,$$

where $h_k=h_k(X_1, \dots, X_n)$ and p_{k} is the k-th power sum symmetric polynomial: $p_k(X_1,\ldots,X_n)=\sum\nolimits_{i=1}^nx_i^k = X_1^k+\cdots+X_n^k$, as above.

For small $k$ we have

$$\begin{align}
h_1 &= p_1,\\
2h_2 &= h_1p_1 + p_2,\\
3h_3 &= h_2p_1 + h_1p_2 + p_3.\\
\end{align}$$

=== Relation with symmetric tensors ===
Consider an n-dimensional vector space V and a linear operator M : V → V with eigenvalues X_{1}, X_{2}, ..., X_{n}. Denote by Sym^{k}(V) its kth symmetric tensor power and M^{Sym(k)} the induced operator Sym^{k}(V) → Sym^{k}(V).

Proposition:

$$\operatorname{Trace}_{\operatorname{Sym}^k(V)} \left(M^{\operatorname{Sym}(k)}\right) = h_{k}(X_1,X_2,\ldots,X_n).$$

The proof is easy: consider an eigenbasis e_{i} for M. The basis in Sym^{k}(V) can be indexed by sequences i_{1} ≤ i_{2} ≤ ... ≤ i_{k}, indeed, consider the symmetrizations of

$$e_{i_1} \otimes\, e_{i_2} \otimes \ldots \otimes\, e_{i_k}$$.

All such vectors are eigenvectors for M^{Sym(k)} with eigenvalues

$$X_{i_1}X_{i_2}\cdots X_{i_k},$$

hence this proposition is true.

Similarly one can express elementary symmetric polynomials via traces over antisymmetric tensor powers. Both expressions are subsumed in expressions of Schur polynomials as traces over Schur functors, which can be seen as the Weyl character formula for GL(V).

=== Complete homogeneous symmetric polynomial with variables shifted by 1 ===
If we replace the variables $X_i$ for $1+X_i$, the symmetric polynomial $h_k(1+X_1, \ldots, 1+X_n)$ can be written as a linear combination of the $h_j(X_1, \ldots, X_n)$, for $0 \le j \le k$,

$$h_k(1+X_1, \ldots, 1+X_n) =
\sum_{j=0}^k \binom{n+k-1}{k-j} h_j(X_1, \ldots, X_n).$$

The proof, as found in Lemma 3.5 of, relies on the combinatorial properties of increasing $k$-tuples $(i_1, \ldots,i_k)$ where $1 \le i_1 \le \cdots \le i_k \le n$.

== See also ==
- Symmetric polynomial
- Elementary symmetric polynomial
- Schur polynomial
- Newton's identities
- MacMahon Master theorem
- Ring of symmetric functions
- Representation theory
