= Exp algebra =

In mathematics, an exp algebra is a Hopf algebra Exp(G) constructed from an abelian group G, and is the universal ring R such that there is an exponential map from G to the group of the formal power series in R[[t]] with constant term 1. In other words the functor Exp from abelian groups to commutative rings is adjoint to the functor from commutative rings to abelian groups taking a ring to the group of formal power series with constant term 1.

The definition of the exp ring of G is similar to that of the group ring Z[G] of G, which is the universal ring such that there is an exponential homomorphism from the group to its units. In particular there is a natural homomorphism from the group ring to a completion of the exp ring. However in general the Exp ring can be much larger than the group ring: for example, the group ring of the integers is the ring of Laurent polynomials in 1 variable, while the exp ring is a polynomial ring in countably many generators.

== Construction ==
For each element g of G introduce a countable set of variables g_{i} for i>0. Define exp(gt) to be the formal power series in t

$$\exp(gt) = 1+g_1t+g_2t^2+g_3t^3+\cdots.$$

The exp ring of G is the commutative ring generated by all the elements g_{i} with the relations

$$\exp((g+h)t) = \exp(gt)\exp(ht)$$

for all g, h in G; in other words the coefficients of any power of t on both sides are identified.

The ring Exp(G) can be made into a commutative and cocommutative Hopf algebra as follows. The coproduct of Exp(G) is defined so that all the elements exp(gt) are group-like. The antipode is defined by making exp(–gt) the antipode of exp(gt). The counit takes all the generators g_{i} to 0.

Hoffman (1983) showed that Exp(G) has the structure of a λ-ring.

== Examples ==
- The exp ring of an infinite cyclic group such as the integers is a polynomial ring in a countable number of generators g_{i} where g is a generator of the cyclic group. This ring (or Hopf algebra) is naturally isomorphic to the ring of symmetric functions (or the Hopf algebra of symmetric functions).
- Michiel Hazewinkel, Nadiya Gubareni, and V. V. Kirichenko (2010) suggest that it might be interesting to extend the theory to non-commutative groups G.
