= Adams operation =

In mathematics, an Adams operation, denoted ψ^{k} for natural numbers k, is a cohomology operation in topological K-theory, or any allied operation in algebraic K-theory or other types of algebraic construction, defined on a pattern introduced by Frank Adams. The basic idea is to implement some fundamental identities in symmetric function theory, at the level of vector bundles or other representing object in more abstract theories.

Adams operations can be defined more generally in any λ-ring.

== K-theory ==
In (algebraic or topological) K-theory, Adams operations $\psi^k$ are ring homomorphisms such that for $k\in\N$,

- $\psi^k(l)=l^k$ if $l$ is the class of a line bundle,
- $\psi^k$ are functorial.

The fundamental idea is that for a vector bundle V on a topological space X, there is an analogy between Adams operators and exterior powers, in which

ψ^{k}(V) is to Λ^{k}(V)

as

the power sum Σ α^{k} is to the k-th elementary symmetric function σ_{k}

of the roots α of a polynomial P(t). (Cf. Newton's identities.) Here Λ^{k} denotes the k-th exterior power. From classical algebra it is known that the power sums are certain integral polynomials Q_{k} in the σ_{k}. The idea is to apply the same polynomials to the Λ^{k}(V), taking the place of σ_{k}. This calculation can be defined in a K-group, in which vector bundles may be formally combined by addition, subtraction and multiplication (tensor product). The polynomials here are called Newton polynomials (not, however, the Newton polynomials of interpolation theory).

Justification of the expected properties comes from the line bundle case, where V is a Whitney sum of line bundles. In this special case the result of any Adams operation is naturally a vector bundle, not a linear combination of ones in K-theory. Treating the line bundle direct factors formally as roots is something rather standard in algebraic topology (cf. the Leray–Hirsch theorem). In general a mechanism for reducing to that case comes from the splitting principle for vector bundles.

== Group representation theory ==
The Adams operation has a simple expression in group representation theory. Let $G$ be a group and $\rho$ a representation of $G$ with character $\chi$. The representation $\psi^k(\rho)$ has character

$$\chi_{\psi^k(\rho)}(g) = \chi_\rho(g^k).$$
