= Ring of symmetric functions =

In algebra and in particular in algebraic combinatorics, the ring of symmetric functions is a specific limit of the rings of symmetric polynomials in n indeterminates, as n goes to infinity. This ring serves as universal structure in which relations between symmetric polynomials can be expressed in a way independent of the number n of indeterminates (but its elements are neither polynomials nor functions). Among other things, this ring plays an important role in the representation theory of the symmetric group.

The ring of symmetric functions can be given a coproduct and a bilinear form making it into a positive selfadjoint graded Hopf algebra that is both commutative and cocommutative.

== Symmetric polynomials ==
The study of symmetric functions is based on that of symmetric polynomials. In a polynomial ring in some finite set of indeterminates, a polynomial is called symmetric if it stays the same whenever the indeterminates are permuted in any way. More formally, there is an action by ring automorphisms of the symmetric group S_{n} on the polynomial ring in n indeterminates, where a permutation acts on a polynomial by simultaneously substituting each of the indeterminates for another according to the permutation used. The invariants for this action form the subring of symmetric polynomials. If the indeterminates are X_{1}, ..., X_{n}, then examples of such symmetric polynomials are

$$X_1+X_2+\cdots+X_n, \,$$
$$X_1^3+X_2^3+\cdots+X_n^3, \,$$

and

$$X_1X_2\cdots X_n. \,$$

A somewhat more complicated example is X_{1}^{3}X_{2}X_{3} + X_{1}X_{2}^{3}X_{3} + X_{1}X_{2}X_{3}^{3} + X_{1}^{3}X_{2}X_{4} + X_{1}X_{2}^{3}X_{4} + X_{1}X_{2}X_{4}^{3} + ... where the summation goes on to include all products of the third power of some variable and two other variables. There are many specific kinds of symmetric polynomials, such as elementary symmetric polynomials, power sum symmetric polynomials, monomial symmetric polynomials, complete homogeneous symmetric polynomials, and Schur polynomials.

== The ring of symmetric functions ==
Most relations between symmetric polynomials do not depend on the number n of indeterminates, other than that some polynomials in the relation might require n to be large enough in order to be defined. For instance the Newton's identity for the third power sum polynomial p_{3} leads to

$$p_3(X_1,\ldots,X_n)=e_1(X_1,\ldots,X_n)^3-3e_2(X_1,\ldots,X_n)e_1(X_1,\ldots,X_n)+3e_3(X_1,\ldots,X_n),$$

where the $e_i$ denote elementary symmetric polynomials; this formula is valid for all natural numbers n, and the only notable dependency on it is that e_{k}(X_{1},...,X_{n}) = 0 whenever n < k. One would like to write this as an identity

$$p_3=e_1^3-3e_2 e_1 + 3e_3$$

that does not depend on n at all, and this can be done in the ring of symmetric functions. In that ring there are nonzero elements e_{k} for all integers k ≥ 1, and any element of the ring can be given by a polynomial expression in the elements e_{k}.

=== Definitions ===
A ring of symmetric functions can be defined over any commutative ring R, and will be denoted Λ_{R}; the basic case is for R = Z. The ring Λ_{R} is in fact a graded R-algebra. There are two main constructions for it; the first one given below can be found in (Stanley, 1999), and the second is essentially the one given in (Macdonald, 1979).

==== As a ring of formal power series ====
The easiest (though somewhat heavy) construction starts with the ring of formal power series $R[[X_1,X_2,...]]$ over R in infinitely (countably) many indeterminates; the elements of this power series ring are formal infinite sums of terms, each of which consists of a coefficient from R multiplied by a monomial, where each monomial is a product of finitely many finite powers of indeterminates. One defines Λ_{R} as its subring consisting of those power series S that satisfy

1. S is invariant under any permutation of the indeterminates, and
2. the degrees of the monomials occurring in S are bounded.

Note that because of the second condition, power series are used here only to allow infinitely many terms of a fixed degree, rather than to sum terms of all possible degrees. Allowing this is necessary because an element that contains for instance a term X_{1} should also contain a term X_{i} for every i > 1 in order to be symmetric. Unlike the whole power series ring, the subring Λ_{R} is graded by the total degree of monomials: due to condition 2, every element of Λ_{R} is a finite sum of homogeneous elements of Λ_{R} (which are themselves infinite sums of terms of equal degree). For every k ≥ 0, the element e_{k} ∈ Λ_{R} is defined as the formal sum of all products of k distinct indeterminates, which is clearly homogeneous of degree k.

==== As an algebraic limit ====
Another construction of Λ_{R} takes somewhat longer to describe, but better indicates the relationship with the rings R[X_{1},...,X_{n}]^{S_{n}} of symmetric polynomials in n indeterminates. For every n there is a surjective ring homomorphism ρ_{n} from the analogous ring R[X_{1},...,X_{n+1}]^{S_{n+1}} with one more indeterminate onto R[X_{1},...,X_{n}]^{S_{n}}, defined by setting the last indeterminate X_{n+1} to 0. Although ρ_{n} has a non-trivial kernel, the nonzero elements of that kernel have degree at least $n+1$ (they are multiples of X_{1}X_{2}...X_{n+1}). This means that the restriction of ρ_{n} to elements of degree at most n is a bijective linear map, and ρ_{n}(e_{k}(X_{1},...,X_{n+1})) = e_{k}(X_{1},...,X_{n}) for all k ≤ n. The inverse of this restriction can be extended uniquely to a ring homomorphism φ_{n} from R[X_{1},...,X_{n}]^{S_{n}} to R[X_{1},...,X_{n+1}]^{S_{n+1}}, as follows for instance from the fundamental theorem of symmetric polynomials. Since the images φ_{n}(e_{k}(X_{1},...,X_{n})) = e_{k}(X_{1},...,X_{n+1}) for k = 1,...,n are still algebraically independent over R, the homomorphism φ_{n} is injective and can be viewed as a (somewhat unusual) inclusion of rings; applying φ_{n} to a polynomial amounts to adding all monomials containing the new indeterminate obtained by symmetry from monomials already present. The ring Λ_{R} is then the "union" (direct limit) of all these rings subject to these inclusions. Since all φ_{n} are compatible with the grading by total degree of the rings involved, Λ_{R} obtains the structure of a graded ring.

This construction differs slightly from the one in (Macdonald, 1979). That construction only uses the surjective morphisms ρ_{n} without mentioning the injective morphisms φ_{n}: it constructs the homogeneous components of Λ_{R} separately, and equips their direct sum with a ring structure using the ρ_{n}. It is also observed that the result can be described as an inverse limit in the category of graded rings. That description however somewhat obscures an important property typical for a direct limit of injective morphisms, namely that every individual element (symmetric function) is already faithfully represented in some object used in the limit construction, here a ring R[X_{1},...,X_{d}]^{S_{d}}. It suffices to take for d the degree of the symmetric function, since the part in degree d of that ring is mapped isomorphically to rings with more indeterminates by φ_{n} for all n ≥ d. This implies that for studying relations between individual elements, there is no fundamental difference between symmetric polynomials and symmetric functions.

=== Defining individual symmetric functions ===
The name "symmetric function" for elements of Λ_{R} is a misnomer: in neither construction are the elements functions, and in fact, unlike symmetric polynomials, no function of independent variables can be associated to such elements (for instance e_{1} would be the sum of all infinitely many variables, which is not defined unless restrictions are imposed on the variables). However the name is traditional and well established; it can be found both in (Macdonald, 1979), which says (footnote on p. 12)

The elements of Λ (unlike those of Λ_{n}) are no longer polynomials: they are formal infinite sums of monomials. We have therefore reverted to the older terminology of symmetric functions.

(here Λ_{n} denotes the ring of symmetric polynomials in n indeterminates), and also in (Stanley, 1999).

To define a symmetric function one must either indicate directly a power series as in the first construction, or give a symmetric polynomial in n indeterminates for every natural number n in a way compatible with the second construction. An expression in an unspecified number of indeterminates may do both, for instance

$$e_2=\sum_{i<j}X_iX_j\,$$

can be taken as the definition of an elementary symmetric function if the number of indeterminates is infinite, or as the definition of an elementary symmetric polynomial in any finite number of indeterminates. Symmetric polynomials for the same symmetric function should be compatible with the homomorphisms ρ_{n} (decreasing the number of indeterminates is obtained by setting some of them to zero, so that the coefficients of any monomial in the remaining indeterminates is unchanged), and their degree should remain bounded. (An example of a family of symmetric polynomials that fails both conditions is $\textstyle\prod_{i=1}^nX_i$; the family $\textstyle\prod_{i=1}^n(X_i+1)$ fails only the second condition.) Any symmetric polynomial in n indeterminates can be used to construct a compatible family of symmetric polynomials, using the homomorphisms ρ_{i} for i < n to decrease the number of indeterminates, and φ_{i} for i ≥ n to increase the number of indeterminates (which amounts to adding all monomials in new indeterminates obtained by symmetry from monomials already present).

The following are fundamental examples of symmetric functions.

- The monomial symmetric functions m_{α}. Suppose α = (α_{1},α_{2},...) is a sequence of non-negative integers, only finitely many of which are non-zero. Then we can consider the monomial defined by α: X^{α} = X_{1}^{α_{1}}X_{2}^{α_{2}}X_{3}^{α_{3}}.... Then m_{α} is the symmetric function determined by X^{α}, i.e. the sum of all monomials obtained from X^{α} by symmetry. For a formal definition, define β ~ α to mean that the sequence β is a permutation of the sequence α and set

$$m_\alpha=\sum\nolimits_{\beta\sim\alpha}X^\beta.$$

This symmetric function corresponds to the monomial symmetric polynomial m_{α}(X_{1},...,X_{n}) for any n large enough to have the monomial X^{α}. The distinct monomial symmetric functions are parametrized by the integer partitions (each m_{α} has a unique representative monomial X^{λ} with the parts λ_{i} in weakly decreasing order). Since any symmetric function containing any of the monomials of some m_{α} must contain all of them with the same coefficient, each symmetric function can be written as an R-linear combination of monomial symmetric functions, and the distinct monomial symmetric functions therefore form a basis of Λ_{R} as an R-module.

- The elementary symmetric functions e_{k}, for any natural number k; one has e_{k} = m_{α} where $\textstyle X^\alpha=\prod_{i=1}^kX_i$. As a power series, this is the sum of all distinct products of k distinct indeterminates. This symmetric function corresponds to the elementary symmetric polynomial e_{k}(X_{1},...,X_{n}) for any n ≥ k.
- The power sum symmetric functions p_{k}, for any positive integer k; one has p_{k} = m_{(k)}, the monomial symmetric function for the monomial X_{1}^{k}. This symmetric function corresponds to the power sum symmetric polynomial p_{k}(X_{1},...,X_{n}) = X_{1}^{k} + ... + X_{n}^{k} for any n ≥ 1.
- The complete homogeneous symmetric functions h_{k}, for any natural number k; h_{k} is the sum of all monomial symmetric functions m_{α} where α is a partition of k. As a power series, this is the sum of all monomials of degree k, which is what motivates its name. This symmetric function corresponds to the complete homogeneous symmetric polynomial h_{k}(X_{1},...,X_{n}) for any n ≥ k.
- The Schur functions s_{λ} for any partition λ, which corresponds to the Schur polynomial s_{λ}(X_{1},...,X_{n}) for any n large enough to have the monomial X^{λ}.

There is no power sum symmetric function p_{0}: although it is possible (and in some contexts natural) to define $\textstyle p_0(X_1,\ldots,X_n)=\sum_{i=1}^nX_i^0=n$ as a symmetric polynomial in n variables, these values are not compatible with the morphisms ρ_{n}. The "discriminant" $\textstyle(\prod_{i<j}(X_i-X_j))^2$ is another example of an expression giving a symmetric polynomial for all n, but not defining any symmetric function. The expressions defining Schur polynomials as a quotient of alternating polynomials are somewhat similar to that for the discriminant, but the polynomials s_{λ}(X_{1},...,X_{n}) turn out to be compatible for varying n, and therefore do define a symmetric function.

=== A principle relating symmetric polynomials and symmetric functions ===
For any symmetric function P, the corresponding symmetric polynomials in n indeterminates for any natural number n may be designated by P(X_{1},...,X_{n}). The second definition of the ring of symmetric functions implies the following fundamental principle:

If P and Q are symmetric functions of degree d, then one has the identity $P=Q$ of symmetric functions if and only if one has the identity P(X_{1},...,X_{d}) = Q(X_{1},...,X_{d}) of symmetric polynomials in d indeterminates. In this case one has in fact P(X_{1},...,X_{n}) = Q(X_{1},...,X_{n}) for any number n of indeterminates.

This is because one can always reduce the number of variables by substituting zero for some variables, and one can increase the number of variables by applying the homomorphisms φ_{n}; the definition of those homomorphisms assures that φ_{n}(P(X_{1},...,X_{n})) = P(X_{1},...,X_{n+1}) (and similarly for Q) whenever n ≥ d. See a proof of Newton's identities for an effective application of this principle.

== Properties of the ring of symmetric functions ==
=== Identities ===
The ring of symmetric functions is a convenient tool for writing identities between symmetric polynomials that are independent of the number of indeterminates: in Λ_{R} there is no such number, yet by the above principle any identity in Λ_{R} automatically gives identities the rings of symmetric polynomials over R in any number of indeterminates. Some fundamental identities are

$$\sum_{i=0}^k(-1)^ie_ih_{k-i}=0=\sum_{i=0}^k(-1)^ih_ie_{k-i}\quad\mbox{for all }k>0,$$

which shows a symmetry between elementary and complete homogeneous symmetric functions; these relations are explained under complete homogeneous symmetric polynomial.

$$ke_k=\sum_{i=1}^k(-1)^{i-1}p_ie_{k-i}\quad\mbox{for all }k\geq0,$$

the Newton identities, which also have a variant for complete homogeneous symmetric functions:

$$kh_k=\sum_{i=1}^kp_ih_{k-i}\quad\mbox{for all }k\geq0.$$

=== Structural properties of Λ_{R} ===
Important properties of Λ_{R} include the following.

1. The set of monomial symmetric functions parametrized by partitions form a basis of Λ_{R} as a graded R-module, those parametrized by partitions of d being homogeneous of degree d; the same is true for the set of Schur functions (also parametrized by partitions).
2. Λ_{R} is isomorphic as a graded R-algebra to a polynomial ring R[Y_{1},Y_{2}, ...] in infinitely many variables, where Y_{i} is given degree i for all i > 0, one isomorphism being the one that sends Y_{i} to e_{i} ∈ Λ_{R} for every i.
3. There is an involutory automorphism ω of Λ_{R} that interchanges the elementary symmetric functions e_{i} and the complete homogeneous symmetric function h_{i} for all i. It also sends each power sum symmetric function p_{i} to (−1)^{i−1}p_{i}, and it permutes the Schur functions among each other, interchanging s_{λ} and s_{λ^{t}} where λ^{t} is the transpose partition of λ.

Property 2 is the essence of the fundamental theorem of symmetric polynomials. It immediately implies some other properties:

- The subring of Λ_{R} generated by its elements of degree at most n is isomorphic to the ring of symmetric polynomials over R in n variables;
- The Hilbert–Poincaré series of Λ_{R} is $\textstyle\prod_{i=1}^\infty\frac1{1-t^i}$, the generating function of the integer partitions (this also follows from property 1);
- For every n > 0, the R-module formed by the homogeneous part of Λ_{R} of degree n, modulo its intersection with the subring generated by its elements of degree strictly less than n, is free of rank 1, and (the image of) e_{n} is a generator of this R-module;
- For every family of symmetric functions (f_{i})_{i>0} in which f_{i} is homogeneous of degree i and gives a generator of the free R-module of the previous point (for all i), there is an alternative isomorphism of graded R-algebras from R[Y_{1},Y_{2}, ...] as above to Λ_{R} that sends Y_{i} to f_{i}; in other words, the family (f_{i})_{i>0} forms a set of free polynomial generators of Λ_{R}.

This final point applies in particular to the family (h_{i})_{i>0} of complete homogeneous symmetric functions. If R contains the field $\mathbb Q$ of rational numbers, it applies also to the family (p_{i})_{i>0} of power sum symmetric functions. This explains why the first n elements of each of these families define sets of symmetric polynomials in n variables that are free polynomial generators of that ring of symmetric polynomials.

The fact that the complete homogeneous symmetric functions form a set of free polynomial generators of Λ_{R} already shows the existence of an automorphism ω sending the elementary symmetric functions to the complete homogeneous ones, as mentioned in property 3. The fact that ω is an involution of Λ_{R} follows from the symmetry between elementary and complete homogeneous symmetric functions expressed by the first set of relations given above.

The ring of symmetric functions Λ_{Z} is the Exp ring of the integers Z. It is also a lambda-ring in a natural fashion; in fact it is the universal lambda-ring in one generator.

=== Generating functions ===
The first definition of Λ_{R} as a subring of $R[[X_1, X_2, ...]]$ allows the generating functions of several sequences of symmetric functions to be elegantly expressed. Contrary to the relations mentioned earlier, which are internal to Λ_{R}, these expressions involve operations taking place in R[[X_{1},X_{2},...;t]] but outside its subring Λ_{R}[[t]], so they are meaningful only if symmetric functions are viewed as formal power series in indeterminates X_{i}. We shall write "(X)" after the symmetric functions to stress this interpretation.

The generating function for the elementary symmetric functions is

$$E(t) = \sum_{k \geq 0} e_k(X)t^k = \prod_{i=1}^\infty (1+X_it).$$

Similarly one has for complete homogeneous symmetric functions

$$H(t) = \sum_{k \geq 0} h_k(X)t^k = \prod_{i=1}^\infty \left(\sum_{k \geq 0} (X_it)^k\right) = \prod_{i=1}^\infty \frac1{1-X_it}.$$

The obvious fact that $E(-t)H(t) = 1 = E(t)H(-t)$ explains the symmetry between elementary and complete homogeneous symmetric functions. The generating function for the power sum symmetric functions can be expressed as

$$P(t) = \sum_{k>0} p_k(X)t^k = \sum_{k>0}\sum_{i=1}^\infty (X_it)^k = \sum_{i=1}^\infty\frac{X_it}{1-X_it} = \frac{tE'(-t)}{E(-t)} = \frac{tH'(t)}{H(t)}$$

((Macdonald, 1979) defines P(t) as Σ_{k>0} p_{k}(X)t^{k−1}, and its expressions therefore lack a factor t with respect to those given here). The two final expressions, involving the formal derivatives of the generating functions E(t) and H(t), imply Newton's identities and their variants for the complete homogeneous symmetric functions. These expressions are sometimes written as

$$P(t) = -t\frac d{dt}\log(E(-t)) = t\frac d{dt}\log(H(t)),$$

which amounts to the same, but requires that R contain the rational numbers, so that the logarithm of power series with constant term 1 is defined (by $\textstyle\log(1-tS) = -\sum_{i>0} \frac1i(tS)^i$).

== Specializations ==
Let $\Lambda$ be the ring of symmetric functions and $R$ a commutative algebra with unit element. An algebra homomorphism $\varphi:\Lambda\to R,\quad f\mapsto f(\varphi)$ is called a specialization.

Example:

- Given some real numbers $a_1,\dots,a_k$ and $f(x_1,x_2,\dots,)\in \Lambda$, then the substitution $x_1=a_1,\dots,x_k=a_k$ and $x_j=0,\forall j>k$ is a specialization.
- Let $f\in \Lambda$, then $\operatorname{ps}(f):=f(1,q,q^2,q^3,\dots)$ is called principal specialization.

== See also ==
- Newton's identities
- Quasisymmetric function
