= Heinz mean =

Mean in mathematics

In mathematics, the Heinz mean (named after E. Heinz) of two non-negative real numbers A and B, was defined by Bhatia as:

$$\operatorname{H}_x(A, B) = \frac{A^x B^{1-x} + A^{1-x} B^x}{2},$$

with 0 ≤ x ≤ 1/2.

For different values of x, this Heinz mean interpolates between the arithmetic (x = 0) and geometric (x = 1/2) means such that for 0 < x < 1/2:

$$\sqrt{A B} = \operatorname{H}_\frac{1}{2}(A, B) < \operatorname{H}_x(A, B) < \operatorname{H}_0(A, B) = \frac{A + B}{2}.$$

The Heinz means appear naturally when symmetrizing $\alpha$-divergences.

It may also be defined in the same way for positive semidefinite matrices, and satisfies a similar interpolation formula.

== See also ==
- Mean
- Muirhead's inequality
- Inequality of arithmetic and geometric means
