= Plethysm =

Mathematical operation in algebra

In algebra, plethysm is an operation on symmetric functions introduced by Dudley E. Littlewood, who denoted it by {λ} ⊗ {μ}. The word "plethysm" for this operation (after the Greek word πληθυσμός meaning "multiplication") was introduced later by Littlewood (1950, p. 289, 1950b, p.274), who said that the name was suggested by M. L. Clark.

If symmetric functions are identified with operations in lambda rings, then plethysm corresponds to composition of operations.

== In representation theory ==
Let V be a vector space over the complex numbers, considered as a representation of the general linear group GL(V). Each Young diagram λ corresponds to a Schur functor L_{λ}(-) on the category of GL(V)-representations. Given two Young diagrams λ and μ, consider the decomposition of L_{λ}(L_{μ}(V)) into a direct sum of irreducible representations of the group. By the representation theory of the general linear group we know that each summand is isomorphic to $L_\nu(V)$ for a Young diagram $\nu$. So for some nonnegative multiplicities $a_{\lambda,\mu,\nu}$ there is an isomorphism

$$L_\lambda(L_\mu(V)) = \bigoplus_{\nu} L_\nu(V)^{\oplus a_{\lambda, \mu, \nu}}.$$

The problem of (outer) plethysm is to find an expression for the multiplicities $a_{\lambda, \mu, \nu}$.

This formulation is closely related to the classical question. The character of the GL(V)-representation L_{λ}(V) is a symmetric function in dim(V) variables, known as the Schur polynomial s_{λ} corresponding to the Young diagram λ. Schur polynomials form a basis in the space of symmetric functions. Hence to understand the plethysm of two symmetric functions it would be enough to know their expressions in that basis and an expression for a plethysm of two arbitrary Schur polynomials {s_{λ}}⊗{s_{μ}} . The second piece of data is precisely the character of L_{λ}(L_{μ}(V)).
