= Dudley E. Littlewood =

British mathematician

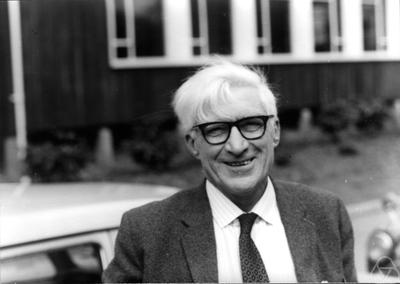
Dudley E. Littlewood

Dudley Ernest Littlewood (7 September 1903, London – 6 October 1979, Llandudno) was a British mathematician known for his work in group representation theory.

He read mathematics at Trinity College, Cambridge, where his tutor was John Edensor Littlewood (they were not related). He was a lecturer at University College, Swansea from 1928 to 1947, and in 1948 took up the chair of mathematics at University College of North Wales, Bangor, retiring in 1970.

He worked on invariant theory and group representation theory, especially of the symmetric group, often in collaboration with Archibald Read Richardson of Swansea. They introduced the immanant of a matrix, studied Schur functions and developed the Littlewood–Richardson rule for their multiplication. Littlewood was also interested in the application of representation theory to quantum mechanics.

== Selected publications ==
- The theory of group characters and matrix representations of groups. 1940; 2nd edition Oxford 1950.
- The skeleton key of mathematics: a simple account of complex algebraic theories, Hutchison & Company, London, 1949; 2nd edition Harper & Brothers, New York, 1960; 2002 Dover pbk reprint; 2013 Dover ebook edition
- A university algebra. (1950); 2nd edition 1961.

== See also ==
- Hall–Littlewood polynomials
- Plethysm
- Restricted representation
