= Maclaurin's inequality =

Inequality in mathematics

In mathematics, Maclaurin's inequality, named after Colin Maclaurin, is a refinement of the inequality of arithmetic and geometric means.

Let $a_1, a_2,\ldots,a_n$ be non-negative real numbers, and for $k=1,2,\ldots,n$, define the averages $S_k$ as follows:

$$S_k = \frac{\displaystyle \sum_{ 1\leq i_1 < \cdots < i_k \leq n}a_{i_1} a_{i_2} \cdots a_{i_k}}{\displaystyle {n \choose k}}.$$

The numerator of this fraction is the elementary symmetric polynomial of degree $k$ in the $n$ variables $a_1, a_2,\ldots,a_n$, that is, the sum of all products of $k$ of the numbers $a_1, a_2,\ldots,a_n$ with the indices in increasing order. The denominator is the number of terms in the numerator, the binomial coefficient $\tbinom n k.$ Maclaurin's inequality is the following chain of inequalities:

$$S_1 \geq \sqrt{S_2} \geq \sqrt[3]{S_3} \geq \cdots \geq \sqrt[n]{S_n}$$,

with equality if and only if all the $a_i$ are equal.

Maclaurin's inequality can be proved using Newton's inequalities or a generalised version of Bernoulli's inequality.

== Examples ==
For $n=2$, Maclaurin's inequality gives the arithmetic mean-geometric mean inequality for two non-negative numbers.

For $n=4$, Maclaurin's inequality states:

$$\begin{align}
&\quad \frac{a_1+a_2+a_3+a_4}{4} \\[8pt]
&\ge \sqrt{\frac{a_1a_2+a_1a_3+a_1a_4+a_2a_3+a_2a_4+a_3a_4}{6}} \\[8pt]
&\ge \sqrt[3]{\frac{a_1a_2a_3+a_1a_2a_4+a_1a_3a_4+a_2a_3a_4}{4}} \\[8pt]
&\ge \sqrt[4]{a_1a_2a_3a_4}.
\end{align}$$

== See also ==
- Bernoulli's inequality
- Bonferroni inequality
- Generalized mean inequality
- Muirhead's inequality
- Newton's inequalities
