= Robert Franklin Muirhead =

Scottish mathematician

Robert Franklin Muirhead (22 January 1860 – 16 January 1941), was a Scottish mathematician who discovered Muirhead's inequality.

== Early life and education ==
Born at Shawlands, Glasgow, in January 1860, Robert Franklyn Muirhead received his early education from private tutors and the village school at Lochwinnoch. After attending the Hamilton Academy and Paisley Grammar school he entered the University of Glasgow, graduating BSc (1879) and MA (1881) gaining highest honours in Mathematics and Natural Philosophy and the Ferguson Scholarship. Winning the four year George A. Clark Scholarship from Glasgow, Muirhead then continued his studies at St Catharine's College, Cambridge, where in 1886 he won the Smith's Prize for his essay on Newton's laws of motion, following a year at the University of Göttingen.

== Career ==
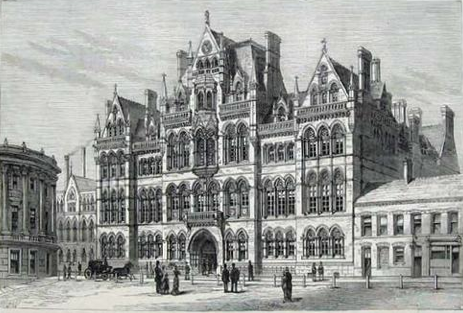
Mason Science College, now the University of Birmingham

Also during his tenureship of the George A. Clark Scholarship, Muirhead conducted classes at the University of Glasgow for pass and honours men thereafter holding teaching posts including as lecturer on Mathematics at Mason Science College (which later became Birmingham University), from 1891 to 1893, in which latter year he married and settled in Glasgow, coaching in mathematics, physics and engineering, and founding the Glasgow Tutorial College.

Muirhead was to publish many papers on mathematics in the Proceedings and Mathematical Notes of the Edinburgh Mathematical Society and in the Mathematical Gazette, but is principally known for Muirhead's inequality and his papers on inequalities.

== Honours ==
Muirhead was elected a member of the Edinburgh Mathematical Society in February 1884, and twice elected its president (in 1899 and 1909.) He was elected an Honorary Member of the Society in 1912.

Robert Franklin Muirhead died at Glasgow in 1941.
