= Vieta's formulas =

Relating coefficients and roots of a polynomial

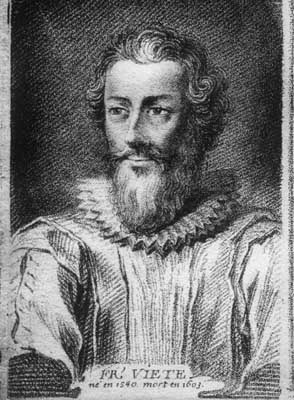
François Viète

In mathematics, Vieta's formulas relate the coefficients of a polynomial to sums and products of its roots. They are named after François Viète (1540-1603), more commonly referred to by the Latinised form of his name, "Franciscus Vieta."

== Basic formulas ==
Any general polynomial of degree n
$$P(x) = a_0 x^n + a_1 x^{n-1} + \cdots + a_{n-1} x + a_n$$
(with the coefficients being real or complex numbers and a_{0} ≠ 0) has n (not necessarily distinct) complex roots r_{1}, r_{2}, ..., r_{n} by the fundamental theorem of algebra. Vieta's formulas relate the polynomial coefficients to signed sums of products of the roots r_{1}, r_{2}, ..., r_{n} as follows:

$$\begin{cases} r_1 + r_2 + \dots + r_{n-1} + r_n = -\dfrac{a_{1}}{a_0} \\[1ex] (r_1 r_2 + r_1 r_3 + \cdots + r_1 r_n) + (r_2r_3 + r_2r_4+\cdots + r_2r_n)+\cdots + r_{n-1}r_n = \dfrac{a_{2}}{a_{0}} \\[1ex] {} \quad \vdots \\[1ex] E_k^{(n)}(r_1,\ldots,r_n) = (-1)^k\dfrac{a_k}{a_0} \\[1ex] {} \quad \vdots \\[1ex] r_1 r_2 \cdots r_n = (-1)^n \dfrac{a_n}{a_0}, \end{cases}$$	*

where $E_k^{(n)}(r_1,\ldots,r_n)$ is the $k$th elementary symmetric polynomial in $n$ indeterminates; that is,
$$E_k^{(n)}(r_1,\ldots,r_n)=\sum_{1\le i_1 < i_2 < \cdots < i_k\le n} \left(\prod_{j = 1}^k r_{i_j}\right)$$
is the sum of all products of $k$ $r_i$ with different indices.

In particular,
$$\begin{aligned}
E_1^{(n)}(r_1,\ldots,r_n)&= r_1+r_2\cdots + r_n,\\
E_n^{(n)}(r_1,\ldots,r_n)&= r_1r_2\cdots r_n,
\end{aligned}$$
and the above expression of degree 2 in the $r_i$ equals $E_2^{(n)}(r_1,\ldots,r_n)$.

== Generalization to rings ==
As stated above, Vieta's formulas remain valid when the coefficients of the polynomial belong to an integral domain and the roots belong to an algebraically closed field. For a further generalization, it is useful to separate the statement in two parts:

- Every polynomial
  $$P(x)=a_0x^n+a_1x^{n-1}+\cdots +a_n$$
  of degree n over an integral domain R factors uniquely, up to the order of the factors, as
  $$P(x)=a_0(x-r_1)\cdots(x-r_n),$$
  where the $r_i$ belong to an algebraically closed field containing R.
- If a polynomial of degree n factors over a commutative ring as
  $$a_0x^n+a_1x^{n-1}+\cdots +a_n=a_0(x-r_1)\cdots(x-r_n),$$
  then one has
  $$a_i= (-1)^ia_0 E_i^{(n)}(r_1,\ldots,r_n)$$
  for $i=1, \ldots,n$, where $E_i^{(n)}$ is the $i$th elementary symmetric polynomial, that is the sum of all products of $i$ of the $r_k$ with different indices.

Vieta's formulas are useful over an integral domain, because they provide relations between the roots without having to compute them. Over a ring that is not an integral domain, some care is needed. For example, in the ring of the integers modulo 8, the quadratic polynomial $P(x) = x^2-1$ has four roots (1, 3, 5, and 7) and two different factorizations:
$$x^2-1=(x-1)(x-7)=(x-3)(x-5)$$
As $P(x)\neq (x-1)(x-3)$, one cannot apply Vieta's formulas with the roots 1 and 3.

== Example ==
Vieta's formulas applied to quadratic and cubic polynomials:

The roots $r_1, r_2$ of the quadratic polynomial $P(x) = ax^2 + bx + c$ satisfy
$$r_1 + r_2 = -\frac{b}{a}, \quad r_1 r_2 = \frac{c}{a}.$$

The first of these equations can be used to find the minimum (or maximum) of P; see Quadratic equation § Vieta's formulas.

The roots $r_1, r_2, r_3$ of the cubic polynomial $P(x) = ax^3 + bx^2 + cx + d$ satisfy
$$r_1 + r_2 + r_3 = -\frac{b}{a}, \quad r_1 r_2 + r_1 r_3 + r_2 r_3 = \frac{c}{a}, \quad r_1 r_2 r_3 = -\frac{d}{a}.$$

== Proof ==
Vieta's formulas can be proved by considering the equality
$$a_n x^n  + a_{n-1}x^{n-1} +\cdots + a_1 x+ a_0 = a_n (x-r_1) (x-r_2) \cdots (x-r_n)$$
(which is true since $r_1, r_2, \dots, r_n$ are all the roots of this polynomial), expanding the products in the right-hand side, and equating the coefficients of each power of $x$ between the two members of the equation.

Formally, if one expands $(x-r_1) (x-r_2) \cdots (x-r_n)$ and regroup the terms by their degree in $x$, one gets

$$\sum_{k=0}^n (-1)^{n-k}x^k \left(\sum_{\stackrel{(\forall i)\; b_i\in\{0,1\}}{b_1+\cdots+b_n=n-k}} r_1^{b_1}\cdots r_n^{b_n}\right),$$

where the inner sum is exactly the $k$th elementary symmetric function

As an example, consider the quadratic
$$f(x) = a_2x^2 + a_1x + a_0 = a_2(x - r_1)(x - r_2) = a_2(x^2 - x(r_1 + r_2) + r_1 r_2).$$

Comparing identical powers of $x$, we find $a_2=a_2$, $a_1=-a_2 (r_1+r_2)$ and $a_0 = a_2 (r_1r_2)$, with which we can for example identify $r_1+r_2 = - a_1/a_2$ and $r_1r_2 = a_0/a_2$, which are Vieta's formula's for $n=2$.

== History ==
The formulas are named after the 16th-century French mathematician François Viète (Franciscus Vieta), who derived them for the case of positive roots. However, the methods of Vieta and those of the 12th-century Islamic mathematician Sharaf al-Din al-Tusi were very close to each other. It is plausible that algebraic advancements made by other Islamic mathematicians such as Omar Khayyam, al-Tusi, and al-Kashi influenced 16th-century algebraists, with Vieta being the most prominent among them.

In the opinion of the 18th-century British mathematician Charles Hutton, as quoted by Funkhouser, the general principle (not restricted to positive real roots) was first understood by the 17th-century French mathematician Albert Girard:

... [Girard was] the first person who understood the general doctrine of the formation of the coefficients of the powers from the sum of the roots and their products. He was the first who discovered the rules for summing the powers of the roots of any equation.

== Generalization to reflection groups ==
The permutation symmetry of the elementary symmetric polynomials can be considered as the Type A_{n-1} case of a finite reflection group. The Chevalley–Shephard–Todd theorem gives analogs of the elementary symmetric polynomials for every such symmetry type, and Vieta's formulas generalize to give the coordinates of the quotient map of linear space by the reflection group.

== See also ==
- Content (algebra)
- Descartes's rule of signs
- Newton's identities
- Gauss–Lucas theorem
- Properties of polynomial roots
- Rational root theorem
- Symmetric polynomial and elementary symmetric polynomial
