= Albert Girard =

French–Dutch mathematician

Albert Girard (French pronunciation: [alˈbɛʁ ʒiˈʁaʁ]) (11 October 1595 in Saint-Mihiel, France − 8 December 1632 in Leiden, Dutch Republic) was a French-born mathematician. He studied at the University of Leiden. He "had early thoughts on the fundamental theorem of algebra" and gave the inductive definition for the Fibonacci numbers. He was the first to use the abbreviations 'sin', 'cos' and 'tan' for the trigonometric functions in a treatise. Girard was the first to state, in 1625, that each prime of the form 1 mod 4 is the sum of two squares. (See Fermat's theorem on sums of two squares.) It was said that he was quiet-natured and, unlike most mathematicians, did not keep a journal for his personal life.

In the opinion of Charles Hutton, Girard was

...the first person who understood the general doctrine of the formation of the coefficients of the powers from the sum of the roots and their products. He was the first who discovered the rules for summing the powers of the roots of any equation.

This had previously been given by François Viète for positive roots, and is today called Vieta's formulas, but Viète did not give these for general roots.

In his paper, Funkhouser locates the work of Girard in the history of the study of equations using symmetric functions. In his work on the theory of equations, Lagrange cited Girard. Still later, in the nineteenth century, this work eventuated in the creation of group theory by Cauchy, Galois and others.

Girard also showed how the area of a spherical triangle depends on its interior angles. The result is called Girard's theorem. He was also a lutenist and mentioned having written a treatise on music, though this was never published.
