= Newton's inequalities =

Set of mathematical inequalities

In mathematics, the Newton inequalities refer to a set of mathematical inequalities related to mathematical series. These inequalities are named after Isaac Newton who proved the theorem in 1707. Suppose a_{1}, a_{2}, ..., a_{n} are non-negative real numbers and let $e_k$ denote the kth elementary symmetric polynomial in a_{1}, a_{2}, ..., a_{n}. Then the elementary symmetric means, given by

$$S_k = \frac{e_k}{\binom{n}{k}},$$

satisfy the inequality

$$S_{k-1}S_{k+1} \le S_k^2.$$

Equality holds if and only if all the numbers a_{i} are equal.

It can be seen that S_{1} is the arithmetic mean, and S_{n} is the n-th power of the geometric mean.

== See also ==
- Maclaurin's inequality
