= Elementary symmetric polynomial =

Mathematical function

In mathematics, specifically in commutative algebra, the elementary symmetric polynomials are one type of basic building block for symmetric polynomials, in the sense that any symmetric polynomial can be expressed as a polynomial in elementary symmetric polynomials. That is, any symmetric polynomial P is given by an expression involving only additions and multiplication of constants and elementary symmetric polynomials. There is one elementary symmetric polynomial of degree d in n variables for each positive integer d ≤ n, and it is formed by adding together all distinct products of d distinct variables.

== Definition ==
The elementary symmetric polynomials in n variables X_{1}, ..., X_{n}, written e_{k}(X_{1}, ..., X_{n}) for k = 1, ..., n, are defined by
$$\begin{align}
e_1 (X_1, X_2, \dots, X_n) &= \sum_{1 \leq a \leq n} X_a,\\
e_2 (X_1, X_2, \dots, X_n) &= \sum_{1 \leq a < b \leq n} X_a X_b,\\
e_3 (X_1, X_2, \dots, X_n) &= \sum_{1 \leq a < b < c \leq n} X_a X_b X_c,
\end{align}$$
and so forth, ending with
$$e_n (X_1, X_2, \dots,X_n) = X_1 X_2 \cdots X_n.$$
In general, for k > 0 we define
$$e_k (X_1 , \ldots , X_n )=\sum_{1\le  a_1 < a_2 < \cdots < a_k \le n} X_{a_1} X_{a_2} \dotsm X_{a_k},$$

Also, e_{k}(X_{1}, ..., X_{n}) = 0 if k > n.

Sometimes, e_{0}(X_{1}, ..., X_{n}) = 1 is included among the elementary symmetric polynomials, but excluding it allows generally simpler formulation of results and properties.

Thus, for each positive integer k less than or equal to n there exists exactly one elementary symmetric polynomial of degree k in n variables. To form the one that has degree k, we take the sum of all products of k-subsets of the n variables. (By contrast, if one performs the same operation using multisets of variables, that is, taking variables with repetition, one arrives at the complete homogeneous symmetric polynomials.)

Given an integer partition (that is, a finite non-increasing sequence of positive integers) λ = (λ_{1}, ..., λ_{m}), one defines the symmetric polynomial e_{λ}(X_{1}, ..., X_{n}), also called an elementary symmetric polynomial, by
$$e_\lambda (X_1, \dots,X_n) = e_{\lambda_1}(X_1, \dots, X_n) \cdot e_{\lambda_2}(X_1, \dots, X_n) \cdots e_{\lambda_m}(X_1, \dots, X_n).$$

Sometimes the notation σ_{k} is used instead of e_{k}.

== Recursive definition ==
The following definition is equivalent to the above and might be useful for computer implementations:

$$\begin{align}
e_1 (X_1, \dots, X_n) &= \sum_{1 \leq j \leq n} X_j,\\
e_k (X_1, \dots, X_n) &= \sum_{1 \leq j \leq n - k + 1} X_j e_{k - 1} (X_{j + 1}, \dots, X_n).
\end{align}$$
This is equivalent with the (doubly) recursive definition:
$$\begin{align}
e_1(x_1)=X_1\\
e_0(X_1, \ldots,X_n) &=1\\
e_k(X_1, \ldots,X_n) &= 0 \qquad \text{if }  k>n\\
e_k(X_1, \dots, X_n) &= e_k(X_1, \dots, X_{n-1}) + X_n e_{k-1}(X_1, \dots, X_{n-1}). \end{align}$$

== Examples ==
The following lists the n elementary symmetric polynomials for the first four positive values of n.

For n = 1,
$$e_1(X_1) = X_1.$$
For n = 2,
$$\begin{align}
e_1(X_1,X_2)  &= X_1 + X_2,\\
e_2(X_1,X_2) &= X_1X_2.
\end{align}$$
For n = 3,
$$\begin{align}
e_1(X_1,X_2,X_3) &= X_1 + X_2 + X_3,\\
e_2(X_1,X_2,X_3) &= X_1X_2 + X_1X_3 + X_2X_3,\\
e_3(X_1,X_2,X_3) &= X_1X_2X_3.
\end{align}$$
For n = 4
$$\begin{align}
e_1(X_1,X_2,X_3,X_4) &= X_1 + X_2 + X_3 + X_4,\\
e_2(X_1,X_2,X_3,X_4) &= X_1X_2 + X_1X_3 + X_1X_4 + X_2X_3 + X_2X_4 + X_3X_4,\\
e_3(X_1,X_2,X_3,X_4) &= X_1X_2X_3 + X_1X_2X_4 + X_1X_3X_4 + X_2X_3X_4,\\
e_4(X_1,X_2,X_3,X_4) &= X_1X_2X_3X_4.
\end{align}$$

== Properties ==
The elementary symmetric polynomials appear when we expand a linear factorization of a monic polynomial: we have the identity
$$\prod_{j=1}^n ( T - X_j)=T^n - e_1(X_1,\ldots,X_n)\,T^{n-1}
+ e_2(X_1,\ldots,X_n)\,T^{n-2} + \cdots +(-1)^n e_n(X_1,\ldots,X_n).$$
That is, when we substitute numerical values for the variables X_{1}, X_{2}, ..., X_{n}, we obtain the monic univariate polynomial (with variable $T$) whose roots are the values substituted for X_{1}, X_{2}, ..., X_{n} and whose coefficients are – up to their sign – the elementary symmetric polynomials. These relations between the roots and the coefficients of a polynomial are called Vieta's formulas.

The characteristic polynomial of a square matrix is an example of application of Vieta's formulas. The roots of this polynomial are the eigenvalues of the matrix. When we substitute these eigenvalues into the elementary symmetric polynomials, we obtain – up to their sign – the coefficients of the characteristic polynomial, which are invariants of the matrix. In particular, the trace (the sum of the elements of the diagonal) is the value of e_{1}, and thus the sum of the eigenvalues. Similarly, the determinant is – up to the sign – the constant term of the characteristic polynomial, i.e. the value of e_{n}. Thus the determinant of a square matrix is the product of the eigenvalues.

The set of elementary symmetric polynomials in n variables generates the ring of symmetric polynomials in n variables. More specifically, the ring of symmetric polynomials with integer coefficients equals the integral polynomial ring $\mathbb{Z}[e_1(X_1, \ldots, X_n), \ldots, e_n(X_1, \ldots, X_n)]$. (See below for a more general statement and proof.) This fact is one of the foundations of invariant theory. For another system of symmetric polynomials with the same property see Complete homogeneous symmetric polynomials, and for a system with a similar, but slightly weaker, property see Power sum symmetric polynomial.

== Fundamental theorem of symmetric polynomials ==
For any commutative ring A, denote the ring of symmetric polynomials in the variables X_{1}, ..., X_{n} with coefficients in A by A[X_{1}, ..., X_{n}]^{S_{n}}. This is a polynomial ring in the n elementary symmetric polynomials e_{k}(X_{1}, ..., X_{n}) for k = 1, ..., n.

This means that every symmetric polynomial P(X_{1}, ..., X_{n}) ∈ A[X_{1}, ..., X_{n}]^{S_{n}} has a unique representation
$$P(X_1,\ldots, X_n)=Q\big(e_1(X_1 , \ldots ,X_n), \ldots, e_n(X_1 , \ldots ,X_n)\big)$$
for some polynomial Q ∈ A[Y_{1}, ..., Y_{n}]. Another way of saying the same thing is that the ring homomorphism that sends Y_{k} to e_{k}(X_{1}, ..., X_{n}) for k = 1, ..., n defines an isomorphism between A[Y_{1}, ..., Y_{n}] and A[X_{1}, ..., X_{n}]^{S_{n}}.

=== Proof sketch ===
The theorem may be proved for symmetric homogeneous polynomials by a double induction with respect to the number of variables n and, for fixed n, with respect to the degree of the homogeneous polynomial. The general case then follows by splitting an arbitrary symmetric polynomial into its homogeneous components (which are again symmetric).

In the case n = 1 the result is trivial because every polynomial in one variable is automatically symmetric.

Assume now that the theorem has been proved for all polynomials for m < n variables and all symmetric polynomials in n variables with degree < d. Every homogeneous symmetric polynomial P in A[X_{1}, ..., X_{n}]^{S_{n}} can be decomposed as a sum of homogeneous symmetric polynomials
$$P(X_1,\ldots,X_n)= P_{\text{lacunary}} (X_1,\ldots,X_n)  + X_1 \cdots X_n \cdot Q(X_1,\ldots,X_n).$$
Here the "lacunary part" P_{lacunary} is defined as the sum of all monomials in P which contain only a proper subset of the n variables X_{1}, ..., X_{n}, i.e., where at least one variable X_{j} is missing.

Because P is symmetric, the lacunary part is determined by its terms containing only the variables X_{1}, ..., X_{n − 1}, i.e., which do not contain X_{n}. More precisely: If A and B are two homogeneous symmetric polynomials in X_{1}, ..., X_{n} having the same degree, and if the coefficient of A before each monomial which contains only the variables X_{1}, ..., X_{n − 1} equals the corresponding coefficient of B, then A and B have equal lacunary parts. (This is because every monomial which can appear in a lacunary part must lack at least one variable, and thus can be transformed by a permutation of the variables into a monomial which contains only the variables X_{1}, ..., X_{n − 1}.)

But the terms of P which contain only the variables X_{1}, ..., X_{n − 1} are precisely the terms that survive the operation of setting X_{n} to 0, so their sum equals P(X_{1}, ..., X_{n − 1}, 0), which is a symmetric polynomial in the variables X_{1}, ..., X_{n − 1} that we shall denote by P̃(X_{1}, ..., X_{n − 1}). By the inductive hypothesis, this polynomial can be written as
$$\tilde{P}(X_1, \ldots, X_{n-1})=\tilde{Q}(\sigma_{1,n-1}, \ldots, \sigma_{n-1,n-1})$$
for some Q̃. Here the doubly indexed σ_{j,n − 1} denote the elementary symmetric polynomials in n − 1 variables.

Consider now the polynomial
$$R(X_1, \ldots, X_{n}):= \tilde{Q}(\sigma_{1,n}, \ldots, \sigma_{n-1,n}) .$$
Then R(X_{1}, ..., X_{n}) is a symmetric polynomial in X_{1}, ..., X_{n}, of the same degree as P_{lacunary}, which satisfies
$$R(X_1, \ldots, X_{n-1},0) = \tilde{Q}(\sigma_{1,n-1}, \ldots, \sigma_{n-1,n-1}) = P(X_1, \ldots,X_{n-1},0)$$
(the first equality holds because setting X_{n} to 0 in σ_{j,n} gives σ_{j,n − 1}, for all j < n). In other words, the coefficient of R before each monomial which contains only the variables X_{1}, ..., X_{n − 1} equals the corresponding coefficient of P. As we know, this shows that the lacunary part of R coincides with that of the original polynomial P. Therefore the difference P − R has no lacunary part, and is therefore divisible by the product X_{1}···X_{n} of all variables, which equals the elementary symmetric polynomial σ_{n,n}. Then writing P − R = σ_{n,n}Q, the quotient Q is a homogeneous symmetric polynomial of degree less than d (in fact degree at most d − n) which by the inductive hypothesis can be expressed as a polynomial in the elementary symmetric functions. Combining the representations for P − R and R one finds a polynomial representation for P.

The uniqueness of the representation can be proved inductively in a similar way. (It is equivalent to the fact that the n polynomials e_{1}, ..., e_{n} are algebraically independent over the ring A.) The fact that the polynomial representation is unique implies that A[X_{1}, ..., X_{n}]^{S_{n}} is isomorphic to A[Y_{1}, ..., Y_{n}].

=== Alternative proof ===
The following proof is also inductive, but does not involve other polynomials than those symmetric in X_{1}, ..., X_{n}, and also leads to a fairly direct procedure to effectively write a symmetric polynomial as a polynomial in the elementary symmetric ones. Assume the symmetric polynomial to be homogeneous of degree d; different homogeneous components can be decomposed separately. Order the monomials in the variables X_{i} lexicographically, where the individual variables are ordered X_{1} > ... > X_{n}, in other words the dominant term of a polynomial is one with the highest occurring power of X_{1}, and among those the one with the highest power of X_{2}, etc. Furthermore parametrize all products of elementary symmetric polynomials that have degree d (they are in fact homogeneous) as follows by partitions of d. Order the individual elementary symmetric polynomials e_{i}(X_{1}, ..., X_{n}) in the product so that those with larger indices i come first, then build for each such factor a column of i boxes, and arrange those columns from left to right to form a Young diagram containing d boxes in all. The shape of this diagram is a partition of d, and each partition λ of d arises for exactly one product of elementary symmetric polynomials, which we shall denote by e_{λ^{t}} (X_{1}, ..., X_{n}) (the t is present only because traditionally this product is associated to the transpose partition of λ). The essential ingredient of the proof is the following simple property, which uses multi-index notation for monomials in the variables X_{i}.

Lemma. The leading term of e_{λ^{t}} (X_{1}, ..., X_{n}) is X^{λ}.

Proof. The leading term of the product is the product of the leading terms of each factor (this is true whenever one uses a monomial order, like the lexicographic order used here), and the leading term of the factor e_{i} (X_{1}, ..., X_{n}) is clearly X_{1}X_{2}···X_{i}. To count the occurrences of the individual variables in the resulting monomial, fill the column of the Young diagram corresponding to the factor concerned with the numbers 1, ..., i of the variables, then all boxes in the first row contain 1, those in the second row 2, and so forth, which means the leading term is X ^{λ}.

Now one proves by induction on the leading monomial in lexicographic order, that any nonzero homogeneous symmetric polynomial P of degree d can be written as polynomial in the elementary symmetric polynomials. Since P is symmetric, its leading monomial has weakly decreasing exponents, so it is some X^{λ} with λ a partition of d. Let the coefficient of this term be c, then P − ce_{λ^{t}} (X_{1}, ..., X_{n}) is either zero or a symmetric polynomial with a strictly smaller leading monomial. Writing this difference inductively as a polynomial in the elementary symmetric polynomials, and adding back ce_{λ^{t}} (X_{1}, ..., X_{n}) to it, one obtains the sought for polynomial expression for P.

The fact that this expression is unique, or equivalently that all the products (monomials) e_{λ^{t}} (X_{1}, ..., X_{n}) of elementary symmetric polynomials are linearly independent, is also easily proved. The lemma shows that all these products have different leading monomials, and this suffices: if a nontrivial linear combination of the e_{λ^{t}} (X_{1}, ..., X_{n}) were zero, one focuses on the contribution in the linear combination with nonzero coefficient and with (as polynomial in the variables X_{i}) the largest leading monomial; the leading term of this contribution cannot be cancelled by any other contribution of the linear combination, which gives a contradiction.

== See also ==
- Newton's identities
- Newton's inequalities
- Maclaurin's inequality
- MacMahon's master theorem
- Representation theory
- Ring of symmetric functions
- Schur polynomial
