= Power sum symmetric polynomial =

In mathematics, specifically in commutative algebra, the power sum symmetric polynomials are a type of basic building block for symmetric polynomials, in the sense that every symmetric polynomial with rational coefficients can be expressed as a sum and difference of products of power sum symmetric polynomials with rational coefficients. However, not every symmetric polynomial with integral coefficients is generated by integral combinations of products of power-sum polynomials: they are a generating set over the rationals, but not over the integers.

== Definition ==
The power sum symmetric polynomial of degree k in $n$ variables x_{1}, ..., x_{n}, written p_{k} for k = 0, 1, 2, ..., is the sum of all kth powers of the variables. Formally,

$$p_k (x_1, x_2, \dots,x_n) = \sum_{i=1}^n x_i^k \, .$$

The first few of these polynomials are

$$p_0 (x_1, x_2, \dots,x_n) = 1 + 1 + \cdots + 1 = n \, ,$$
$$p_1 (x_1, x_2, \dots,x_n) = x_1 + x_2 + \cdots + x_n \, ,$$
$$p_2 (x_1, x_2, \dots,x_n) = x_1^2 + x_2^2 + \cdots + x_n^2 \, ,$$
$$p_3 (x_1, x_2, \dots,x_n) = x_1^3 + x_2^3 + \cdots + x_n^3 \, .$$

Thus, for each nonnegative integer $k$, there exists exactly one power sum symmetric polynomial of degree $k$ in $n$ variables.

The polynomial ring formed by taking all integral linear combinations of products of the power sum symmetric polynomials is a commutative ring.

== Examples ==
The following lists the $n$ power sum symmetric polynomials of positive degrees up to n for the first three positive values of $n.$ In every case, $p_0 = n$ is one of the polynomials. The list goes up to degree n because the power sum symmetric polynomials of degrees 1 to n are basic in the sense of the theorem stated below.

For n = 1:

$$p_1 = x_1\,.$$

For n = 2:

$$p_1 = x_1 + x_2\,,$$
$$p_2 = x_1^2 + x_2^2\,.$$

For n = 3:

$$p_1 = x_1 + x_2 + x_3\,,$$
$$p_2 = x_1^2 + x_2^2 + x_3^2\,,$$
$$p_3 = x_1^3+x_2^3+x_3^3\,,$$

== Properties ==
The set of power sum symmetric polynomials of degrees 1, 2, ..., n in n variables generates the ring of symmetric polynomials in n variables. More specifically:

Theorem. The ring of symmetric polynomials with rational coefficients equals the rational polynomial ring $\mathbb Q[p_1,\ldots,p_n].$ The same is true if the coefficients are taken in any field of characteristic 0.

However, this is not true if the coefficients must be integers. For example, for n = 2, the symmetric polynomial

$$P(x_1,x_2) = x_1^2 x_2 + x_1 x_2^2 + x_1x_2$$

has the expression

$$P(x_1,x_2) = \frac{p_1^3-p_1p_2}{2} + \frac{p_1^2-p_2}{2} \,,$$

which involves fractions. According to the theorem this is the only way to represent $P(x_1,x_2)$ in terms of p_{1} and p_{2}. Therefore, P does not belong to the integral polynomial ring $\mathbb Z[p_1,\ldots,p_n].$ For another example, the elementary symmetric polynomials e_{k}, expressed as polynomials in the power sum polynomials, do not all have integral coefficients. For instance,

$$e_2 := \sum_{1 \leq i<j \leq n} x_ix_j = \frac{p_1^2-p_2}{2} \, .$$

The theorem is also untrue if the field has characteristic different from 0. For example, if the field F has characteristic 2, then $p_2 = p_1^2$, so p_{1} and p_{2} cannot generate e_{2} = x_{1}x_{2}.

Sketch of a partial proof of the theorem: By Newton's identities the power sums are functions of the elementary symmetric polynomials; this is implied by the following recurrence relation, though the explicit function that gives the power sums in terms of the e_{j} is complicated:

$$p_n = (-1)^{n-1}ne_n + \sum_{j=1}^{n-1} (-1)^{j-1} e_j p_{n-j} \,.$$

Rewriting the same recurrence, one has the elementary symmetric polynomials in terms of the power sums (also implicitly, the explicit formula being complicated):

$$e_n = \frac{1}{n} \sum_{j=1}^n (-1)^{j-1} e_{n-j} p_j \,.$$

This implies that the elementary polynomials are rational, though not integral, linear combinations of the power sum polynomials of degrees 1, ..., n. Since the elementary symmetric polynomials are an algebraic basis for all symmetric polynomials with coefficients in a field, it follows that every symmetric polynomial in n variables is a polynomial function $f(p_1,\ldots,p_n)$ of the power sum symmetric polynomials p_{1}, ..., p_{n}. That is, the ring of symmetric polynomials is contained in the ring generated by the power sums, $\mathbb Q[p_1,\ldots,p_n].$ Because every power sum polynomial is symmetric, the two rings are equal.

(This does not show how to prove the polynomial f is unique.)

For another system of symmetric polynomials with similar properties see complete homogeneous symmetric polynomials.

== See also ==
- Representation theory
- Newton's identities
