= Monomial =

Polynomial with only one term

In mathematics, a monomial is, roughly speaking, a polynomial which has only one term. Two definitions of a monomial may be encountered:

1. A monomial, also called a power product or primitive monomial, is a product of powers of variables with nonnegative integer exponents, or, in other words, a product of variables, possibly with repetitions. For example,$x^2yz^3=xxyzzz$ is a monomial. The constant $1$ is a primitive monomial, being equal to the empty product and to $x^0$ any variable $x$. If only a single variable $x$ is considered, this means that a monomial is either $1$ or a power $x^n$ of $x$, with $n$ a positive integer. If several variables are considered, say, $x, y, z,$ then each can be given an exponent so that any monomial is of the form $x^a y^b z^c$ with $a,b,c$ non-negative integers (taking note that any exponent $0$ makes the corresponding factor equal to $1$).
2. A monomial in the first sense is multiplied by a nonzero constant, called the coefficient of the monomial. A primitive monomial is a special case of a monomial in this second sense, where the coefficient is $1$. For example, in this interpretation, $-7x^5$ and $(3-4i)x^4yz^{13}$ are monomials (in the second example, the variables are $x, y, z,$ and the coefficient is a complex number).

In the context of Laurent polynomials and Laurent series, the exponents of a monomial may be negative, and in the context of Puiseux series, the exponents may be rational numbers.

In mathematical analysis, it is common to consider polynomials written in terms of a shifted variable $\bar{x} = x - c$ for some constant $c$ rather than a variable $x$ alone, as in the study of Taylor series. By a slight abuse of notation, monomials of shifted variables, for instance $2\bar{x}^3 = 2(x - c)^3,$ may be called monomials in the sense of shifted monomials or centered monomials, where $c$ is the center or $-c$ is the shift.

Since the word "monomial", as well as the word "polynomial", comes from the late Latin word "binomium" (binomial), by changing the prefix "bi-" (two in Latin), a monomial should theoretically be called a "mononomial". "Monomial" is a syncope by haplology of "mononomial".

== Comparison of the two definitions ==
With either definition, the set of monomials is a subset of all polynomials that is closed under multiplication.

Both uses of this notion can be found, and in many cases the distinction is simply ignored, see for instance examples for the first and second meaning. In informal discussions the distinction is seldom important, and tendency is towards the broader second meaning. When studying the structure of polynomials however, one often definitely needs a notion with the first meaning. This is for instance the case when considering a monomial basis of a polynomial ring, or a monomial ordering of that basis. An argument in favor of the first meaning is that no obvious other notion is available to designate these values, though primitive monomial is in use and does make the absence of constants clear.

The remainder of this article assumes the first meaning of "monomial".

== Monomial basis ==
The most obvious fact about monomials (first meaning) is that any polynomial is a linear combination of them, so they form a basis of the vector space of all polynomials, called the monomial basis - a fact of constant implicit use in mathematics.

== Number ==
The number of monomials of degree $d$ in $n$ variables is the number of multicombinations of $d$ elements chosen among the $n$ variables (a variable can be chosen more than once, but order does not matter), which is given by the multiset coefficient $\left(!!\binom{n}{d}!!\right)$. This expression can also be given in the form of a binomial coefficient, as a polynomial expression in $d$, or using a rising factorial power of $d+1$:
$$\left(!!\binom{n}{d}!!\right)
= \binom{n+d-1}{d} = \binom{d+(n-1)}{n-1}
= \frac{(d+1)\times(d+2)\times\cdots\times(d+n-1)}{1\times2\times\cdots\times(n-1)}
= \frac{1}{(n-1)!}(d+1)^{\overline{n-1}}.$$
The latter forms are particularly useful when one fixes the number of variables and lets the degree vary. From these expressions one sees that for fixed n, the number of monomials of degree d is a polynomial expression in $d$ of degree $n-1$ with leading coefficient $\frac{1}{(n-1)!}$.

For example, the number of monomials in three variables ($n=3$) of degree d is $\frac{1}{2}(d+1)^{\overline2} = \frac{1}{2}(d+1)(d+2)$; these numbers form the sequence 1, 3, 6, 10, 15, ... of triangular numbers.

The Hilbert series is a compact way to express the number of monomials of a given degree: the number of monomials of degree $d$ in $n$ variables is the coefficient of degree $d$ of the formal power series expansion of
$$\frac{1}{(1-t)^n}.$$

The number of monomials of degree at most d in n variables is $\binom{n+d}{n} = \binom{n+d}{d}$. This follows from the one-to-one correspondence between the monomials of degree $d$ in $n+1$ variables and the monomials of degree at most $d$ in $n$ variables, which consists in substituting by 1 the extra variable.

== Multi-index notation ==
The multi-index notation is often useful for having a compact notation, specially when there are more than two or three variables. If the variables being used form an indexed family like $x_1, x_2, x_3, \ldots,$ one can set
$$x=(x_1, x_2, x_3, \ldots),$$
and
$$\alpha = (a, b, c,\ldots).$$
Then the monomial
$$x_1^a x_2^b x_3^c \cdots$$
can be compactly written as
$$x^{\alpha}.$$

With this notation, the product of two monomials is simply expressed by using the addition of exponent vectors:
$$x^\alpha x^\beta=x^{\alpha+\beta}.$$

== Degree ==
The degree of a monomial is defined as the sum of all the exponents of the variables, including the implicit exponents of 1 for the variables which appear without exponent; e.g., in the example of the previous section, the degree is $a+b+c$. The degree of $x y z^2$ is 1+1+2=4. The degree of a nonzero constant is 0. For example, the degree of −7 is 0.

The degree of a monomial is sometimes called order, mainly in the context of series. It is also called total degree when it is needed to distinguish it from the degree in one of the variables.

Monomial degree is fundamental to the theory of univariate and multivariate polynomials. Explicitly, it is used to define the degree of a polynomial and the notion of homogeneous polynomial, as well as for graded monomial orderings used in formulating and computing Gröbner bases. Implicitly, it is used in grouping the terms of a Taylor series in several variables.

== Geometry ==
In algebraic geometry the varieties defined by monomial equations $x^{\alpha} = 0$ for some set of α have special properties of homogeneity. This can be phrased in the language of algebraic groups, in terms of the existence of a group action of an algebraic torus (equivalently by a multiplicative group of diagonal matrices). This area is studied under the name of torus embeddings.

== See also ==
- Monomial representation
- Monomial matrix
- Homogeneous polynomial
- Homogeneous function
- Multilinear form
- Log-log plot
- Power law
- Sparse polynomial
