= Schützenberger =

Schützenberger may refer to these people:

- Anne Ancelin Schützenberger (1919–2018)
- Paul Schützenberger, French chemist
- René Schützenberger, French painter
- Marcel-Paul "Marco" Schützenberger, French mathematician and Doctor of Medicine, known for
1. Schutzenberger group
2. Schützenberger theorem
3. Chomsky–Schützenberger enumeration theorem
4. Chomsky–Schützenberger representation theorem
5. Chomsky–Schützenberger hierarchy
