= Manin matrix =

In mathematics, Manin matrices, named after Yuri Manin who introduced them around 1987–88, are a class of matrices with elements in a not-necessarily commutative ring, which in a certain sense behave like matrices whose elements commute. In particular there is natural definition of the determinant for them and most linear algebra theorems like Cramer's rule, Cayley–Hamilton theorem, etc. hold true for them. Any matrix with commuting elements is a Manin matrix. These matrices have applications in representation theory in particular to Capelli's identity, Yangian and quantum integrable systems.

Manin matrices are particular examples of Manin's general construction of "non-commutative symmetries" which can be applied to any algebra. From this point of view they are "non-commutative endomorphisms" of polynomial algebra C[x_{1}, ...x_{n}]. Taking (q)-(super)-commuting variables one will get (q)-(super)-analogs of Manin matrices, which are closely related to quantum groups. Manin works were influenced by the quantum group theory. He discovered that quantized algebra of functions Fun_{q}(GL) can be defined by the requirement that T and T^{t} are simultaneously q-Manin matrices. In that sense it should be stressed that (q)-Manin matrices are defined only by half of the relations of related quantum group Fun_{q}(GL), and these relations are enough for many linear algebra theorems.

== Definition ==
=== Context ===
Matrices with generic noncommutative elements do not admit a natural construction of the determinant with values in a ground ring and basic theorems of the linear algebra fail to hold true. There are several modifications of the determinant theory: Dieudonné determinant which takes values in the abelianization K^{*}/[K^{*}, K^{*}] of the multiplicative group K^{*} of ground ring K; and theory of quasideterminants. But the analogy between these determinants and commutative determinants is not complete. On the other hand, if one considers certain specific classes of matrices with non-commutative elements, then there are examples where one can define the determinant and prove linear algebra theorems which are very similar to their commutative analogs. Examples include: quantum groups and q-determinant; Capelli matrix and Capelli determinant; super-matrices and Berezinian.

Manin matrices is a general and natural class of matrices with not-necessarily commutative elements which admit natural definition of the determinant and generalizations of the linear algebra theorems.

=== Formal definition ===
An n by m matrix M with entries M_{ij} over a ring R (not necessarily commutative) is a Manin matrix if all elements in a given column commute and if for all i,j,k,l it holds that [M_{ij},M_{kl}] = [M_{kj},M_{il}]. Here [a,b] denotes (ab − ba) the commutator of a and b.

The definition can be better seen from the following formulas. A rectangular matrix M is called a Manin matrix if for any 2×2 submatrix, consisting of rows i and k, and columns j and l:

$$\begin{pmatrix}
\cdots & \cdots& \cdots&\cdots&\cdots\\
\cdots & M_{ij} &\cdots & M_{il} & \cdots \\
\cdots & \cdots& \cdots&\cdots&\cdots\\
\cdots & M_{kj} &\cdots & M_{kl}& \cdots \\
\cdots & \cdots& \cdots&\cdots&\cdots
\end{pmatrix} =
\begin{pmatrix}
\cdots & \cdots& \cdots&\cdots&\cdots\\
\cdots & a &\cdots & b& \cdots \\
\cdots & \cdots& \cdots&\cdots&\cdots\\
\cdots & c &\cdots & d& \cdots \\
\cdots & \cdots& \cdots&\cdots&\cdots
\end{pmatrix}$$

the following commutation relations hold

$$ac =  ca,~~~ bd =  db,~~~  \text{(entries in the same column commute) }$$

$$ad - da  = cb - bc,~~~  \text{(cross commutation relation)}.$$

=== Ubiquity of 2 × 2 Manin matrices ===
Below are presented some examples of the appearance of the Manin property in various very simple and natural questions concerning 2×2 matrices. The general idea is the following: consider well-known facts of linear algebra and look how to relax the commutativity assumption for matrix elements such that the results will be preserved to be true. The answer is: if and only if M is a Manin matrix. The proofs of all observations is direct 1 line check.

Consider a 2×2 matrix
$$M =
\begin{pmatrix}
a & b \\
c & d
\end{pmatrix}.$$

Observation 1. Coaction on a plane.
Consider the polynomial ring C[x_{1}, x_{2}], and assume that the matrix elements a, b, c, d commute with x_{1}, x_{2}. Define y_{1}, y_{2} by

$$\begin{pmatrix}
y_1 \\
y_2
\end{pmatrix}
=
\begin{pmatrix}
a & b \\
c & d
\end{pmatrix}
\begin{pmatrix}
x_1 \\
x_2
\end{pmatrix}.$$

Then y_{1}, y_{2} commute among themselves if and only if M is a Manin matrix.

Proof:

$$[y_1, y_2] = [ax_1 + bx_2, cx_1 + dx_2] = [a, c]x^2_1
+ [b, d]x^2_2
+ ([a, d] + [b, c])x_1x_2.$$

Requiring this to be zero, we get Manin's relations.

Observation 2. Coaction on a super-plane.
Consider the Grassmann algebra C[ψ_{1}, ψ_{2}], and assume that the matrix elements a, b, c, d commute with ψ_{1}, ψ_{2}. Define φ_{1}, φ_{2} by

$$\begin{pmatrix}
\phi_1, ~
\phi_2
\end{pmatrix}
=
\begin{pmatrix}
\psi_1 , ~
\psi_2
\end{pmatrix}
\begin{pmatrix}
a & b \\
c & d
\end{pmatrix}.$$

Then φ_{1}, φ_{2} are Grassmann variables (i.e. anticommute among themselves and φ_{i}^{2}=0) if and only if M is a Manin matrix.

Observations 1,2 holds true for general n × m Manin matrices. They demonstrate original Manin's approach as described below (one should thought of usual matrices as homomorphisms of polynomial rings, while Manin matrices are more general "non-commutative homomorphisms"). Pay attention that polynomial algebra generators are presented as column vectors, while Grassmann algebra as row-vectors, the same can be generalized to arbitrary pair of Koszul dual algebras and associated general Manin matrices.

Observation 3. Cramer's rule. The inverse matrix is given by the standard formula

$$M^{-1} =  \frac{1}{ad-cb}
\begin{pmatrix}
d & -b \\
-c & a
\end{pmatrix}$$

if and only if M is a Manin matrix.

Proof:

$$\begin{pmatrix}
d & -b \\
-c & a
\end{pmatrix}
\begin{pmatrix}
a & b \\
c & d
\end{pmatrix}
=
\begin{pmatrix}
da-bc & db-bd \\
-ca+ac & -cb+ad
\end{pmatrix}
=
\text{if and only if }M\text{ is a Manin matrix}
=
\begin{pmatrix}
ad-cb & 0 \\
0 & ad-cb
\end{pmatrix}.$$

Observation 4. Cayley–Hamilton theorem. The equality

$$M^2-(a+d)M+(ad-cb)1_{2\times 2} =0$$

holds if and only if M is a Manin matrix.

Observation 5. Multiplicativity of determinants.

det^{column}(MN) = det^{column}(M)det(N) holds true for all complex-valued matrices N if and only if M is a Manin matrix.

Where det^{column} of 2×2 matrix is defined as ad − cb, i.e. elements from first column (a,c) stands first in the products.

=== Conceptual definition. Concept of "non-commutative symmetries" ===
According to Yu. Manin's ideology one can associate to any algebra certain bialgebra of its "non-commutative symmetries (i.e. endomorphisms)". More generally to a pair of algebras A, B one can associate its algebra of "non-commutative homomorphisms" between A and B. These ideas are naturally related with ideas of non-commutative geometry. Manin matrices considered here are examples of this general construction applied to polynomial algebras C[x_{1}, ...x_{n}].

The realm of geometry concerns of spaces, while the realm of algebra respectively with algebras, the bridge between the two realms is association to each space an algebra of functions on it, which is commutative algebra. Many concepts of geometry can be respelled in the language of algebras and vice versa.

The idea of symmetry G of space V can be seen as action of G on V, i.e. existence of a map G× V -> V. This idea can be translated in the algebraic language as existence of homomorphism Fun(G)$\otimes$ Fun(V) <- Fun(V) (as usually maps between functions and spaces go in opposite directions). Also maps from a space to itself can be composed (they form a semigroup), hence a dual object Fun(G) is a bialgebra.

Finally one can take these two properties as basics and give purely algebraic definition of "symmetry" which can be applied to an arbitrary algebra (non-necessarily commutative):

Definition. Algebra of non-commutative symmetries (endomorphisms) of some algebra A is a bialgebra End(A), such that there exists homomorphisms called coaction:

$coaction: ~~ End(A) \otimes A \leftarrow A,$

which is compatible with a comultiplication in a natural way. Finally End(A) is required to satisfy only the relations which come from the above, no other relations, i.e. it is universal coacting bialgebra for A.

Coaction should be thought as dual to action G× V -> V, that is why it is called coaction. Compatibility of the comultiplication map with the coaction map, is dual to g (h v) = (gh) v. One can easyly write this compatibility.

Somewhat surprising fact is that this construction applied to the polynomial algebra C[x_{1}, ..., x_{n}] will give not the usual algebra of matrices Mat_{n} (more precisely algebra of function on it), but much bigger non-commutative algebra of Manin matrices (more precisely algebra generated by elements M_{ij}. More precisely the following simple propositions hold true.

Proposition. Consider polynomial algebra Pol = C[x_{1}, ..., x_{n}] and matrix M with elements in some algebra EndPol. The elements $y_i = \sum_k M_{i k }\otimes x_k \in EndPol \otimes Pol$ commute among themselves if and only if M is a Manin matrix.

Corollary. The map $x_i \mapsto y_i = \sum_k M_{i k }\otimes x_k$ is homomorphism from Pol to EndPol $\otimes$ Pol. It defines coaction.

Indeed, to ensure that the map is homomorphism the only thing we need to check is that y_{i} commute among themselves.

Proposition. Define the comultiplication map by the formula $\Delta (M_{ij})= \sum_l M_{il} \otimes M_{lj}$. Then it is coassociative and is compatible with coaction on the polynomial algebra defined in the previous proposition.

The two propositions above imply that the algebra generated by elements of a Manin matrix is a bialgebra coacting on the polynomial algebra. If one does not impose other relations ones get algebra of non-commutative endomorphisms of the polynomial algebra.

== Properties ==
=== Elementary examples and properties ===
- Any matrix with commuting elements is a Manin matrix.
- Any matrix whose elements from different rows commute among themselves (such matrices sometimes called Cartier-Foata matrices) is a Manin matrix.
- Any submatrix of a Manin matrix is a Manin matrix.
- One can interchange rows and columns in a Manin matrix the result will also be a Manin matrix. One can add row or column multiplied by the central element to another row or column and results will be Manin matrix again. I.e. one can make elementary transformations with restriction that multiplier is central.
- Consider two Manin matrices M,N such that their all elements commute, then the sum M+N and the product MN will also be Manin matrices.
- If matrix M and simultaneously transpose matrix M^{t} are Manin matrices, then all elements of M commute with each other.
- No-go facts: M^{k} is not a Manin matrix in general (except k=-1 discussed below); neither det(M), nor Tr(M) are central in the algebra generated by M_{ij} in general (in that respect Manin matrices differs from quantum groups); det(e^{M}) ≠ e^{Tr(M)}; log(det(M)) ≠ Tr(log(M)).
- Consider polynomial algebra C[x_{ij}] and denote by $\partial_{ij}$ the operators of differentiation with respect to

x_{ij}, form matrices X, D with the corresponding elements. Also consider variable z and corresponding differential operator $\partial_z$. The following gives an example of a Manin matrix which is important for Capelli identities:

$$\begin{pmatrix}
zId & D^t \\
X   & \partial_z Id
\end{pmatrix}.$$

One can replace X, D by any matrices whose elements satisfy the relation: X_{ij} D_{kl} - D_{kl} X_{ij} = δ_{ik}δ_{kl}, same about z and its derivative.

Calculating the determinant of this matrix in two ways: direct and via Schur complement formula essentially gives Capelli's identity and its generalization (see section 4.3.1, based on).

=== Determinant = column-determinant ===
The determinant of a Manin matrix can be defined by the standard formula, with the prescription that elements from the first columns comes first in the product.

=== Linear algebra theorems ===
Many linear algebra statements hold for Manin matrices even when R is not commutative. In particular, the determinant can be defined in the standard way using permutations and it satisfies a Cramer's rule. MacMahon Master theorem holds true for Manin matrices and actually for their generalizations (super), (q), etc. analogs.

Proposition. Cramer's rule (See or section 4.1.) The inverse to a Manin matrix M can be defined by the standard formula: $M^{-1} = \frac{1}{{\det}^{col}(M)} M^{adj},$ where M^{adj} is adjugate matrix given by the standard formula - its (i,j)-th element is the column-determinant of the (n − 1) × (n − 1) matrix that results from deleting row j and column i of M and multiplication by (-1)^{i+j}.

The only difference with commutative case is that one should pay attention that all determinants are calculated as column-determinants and also adjugate matrix stands on the right, while commutative inverse to the determinant of M stands on the left, i.e. due to non-commutativity the order is important.

Proposition. Inverse is also Manin. (See section 4.3.) Assume a two-sided inverse to a Manin matrix M exists, then it will also be a Manin matrix. Moreover, det(M^{−1}) = (det(M))^{−1}.

This proposition is somewhat non-trivial, it implies the result by Enriquez-Rubtsov and Babelon-Talon in the theory of quantum integrable systems (see section 4.2.1).

Proposition. Cayley–Hamilton theorem (See section 7.1.)

$$det^{column}(t-M)|_{t=M}^{right~substitute}=0 ,~~i.e.~~
\sum_{i=0...n} (-1)^{i}\sigma_i M^{n-i} =0.$$

Where σ_{i} are coefficients of the characteristic polynomial $det^{column}(t-M)= \sum_{i=0...n} (-1)^{i}\sigma_i t^{n-i}$.

Proposition. Newton identities (See section 7.2.1.) $\forall k \ge 0: -(-1)^k k \sigma_k = \sum_{i=0...k-1} \sigma_i Tr(M^{k-i})$

Where σ_{i} are coefficients of the characteristic polynomial $det^{column}(t-M)= \sum_{i=0...n} (-1)^{i}\sigma_i t^{n-i}$, and by convention σ_{i}=0, for i>n, where n is size of matrix M.

Proposition. Determinant via Schur complement (See section 5.2.) Assume block matrix below is a Manin matrix and two-sided inverses M^{−1}, A^{−1}, D^{−1} exist, then

$$det^{column}\begin{pmatrix}
A & B \\
C & d \\
\end{pmatrix} =
det^{column}( A)det^{column}(D-C A^{-1}B) =
det^{column}( D)det^{column}(A-B D^{-1}C).$$

Moreover, Schur complements $(D-C A^{-1}B),(A-B D^{-1}C)$ are Manin matrices.

Proposition. MacMahon Master theorem

== Examples and applications ==
=== Capelli matrix as Manin matrix, and center of U(gl_{n}) ===
The Capelli identity from 19th century gives one of the first examples of determinants for matrices with non-commuting elements. Manin matrices give a new look on this classical subject. This example is related to Lie algebra gl_{n} and serves as a prototype for more complicated applications to loop Lie algebra for gl_{n}, Yangian and integrable systems.

Take E_{ij} be matrices with 1 at position (i,j) and zeros everywhere else. Form a matrix E with elements E_{ij} at position (i,j). It is matrix with elements in ring of matrices Mat_{n}. It is not Manin matrix however there are modifications which transform it to Manin matrix as described below.

Introduce a formal variable z which commute with E_{ij}, respectively d/dz is operator of differentiation in z. The only thing which will be used that commutator of these operators is equal to 1.

Observation. The matrix $d/dz Id - E/z$ is a Manin matrix.

Here Id is identity matrix.

2 × 2 example:
$$M =
\begin{pmatrix}
d/dz - E_{11}/z & - E_{12}/z \\
- E_{21}/z & d/z - E_{22}/z
\end{pmatrix}.$$

It is instructive to check the column commutativity requirement: $[ d/dz - E_{11}/z , - E_{21}/z] = [ d/dz , - E_{21}/z] + [ - E_{11}/z , - E_{21}/z] = E_{21}/z^2 -E_{21}/z^2 = 0$.

Observation. The matrix $exp(-d/dz)(Id + E/z)$ is a Manin matrix.

The only fact required from E_{ij} for these observations is that they satisfy commutation relations [E_{ij}, E_{kl}]= δ_{jk}E_{il} - δ_{li}E_{kj}. So observations holds true if E_{ij} are generators of the universal enveloping algebra of Lie algebra gl_{n}, or its images in any representation. For example, one can take

$$E_{ij} =  x_i \frac{\partial}{\partial x_j}; ~~~~~
E_{ij} = \sum_{a=1}^n x_{ia}\frac{\partial}{\partial x_{ja}}; ~~~~ E_{ij} =  \psi_{i}\frac{\partial}{\partial \psi_{j}}.$$

Here ψ are Grassmann variables.

Observation. $z^{n-1} det^{col}(d/dz - E/z) = det^{col}(zd/dz - E - diag(n-1,n-2,...,1,0) )$

On the right hand side of this equality one recognizes the Capelli determinant (or more precisely the Capelli characteristic polynomial), while on the left hand side one has a Manin matrix with its natural determinant. So Manin matrices gives new look on Capelli's determinant. Moreover, Capelli identity and its generalization can be derived by techniques of Manin matrices. Also it gives an easy way to prove that this expression belongs to the center of the universal enveloping algebra U(gl_{n}), which is far from being trivial. Indeed, it's enough to check invariance with respect to action of the group GL_{n} by conjugation. $det^{col}(d/dz - gEg^{-1}/z) = det^{col}(g(d/dz - E/z)g^{-1}) = det(g) det^{col}(d/dz - E/z) det (g^{-1})= det^{col} (d/dz - E/z)$. So the only property used here is that $det(gM)=det(Mg)=det(M)det(g)$ which is true for any Manin matrix M and any matrix g with central (e.g. scalar) elements.

=== Yangian type matrices as Manin matrices ===
Observation. Let T(z) be a generating matrix of the Yangian for gl_{n}. Then the matrix exp(-d/dz) T(z) is a Manin matrix.

The quantum determinant for Yangian can be defined as exp (n d/dz)det^{column}(exp(-d/dz) T(z)). Pay attention that exp(-d/dz) can be cancelled, so the expression does not depend on it. So the determinant in Yangian theory has natural interpretation via Manin matrices.

For the sake of quantum integrable systems it is important to construct commutative subalgebras in Yangian. It is well known that in the classical limit expressions Tr(T^{k}(z)) generate Poisson commutative subalgebra. The correct quantization of these expressions has been first proposed by the use of Newton identities for Manin matrices:

Proposition. Coefficients of Tr(T(z+k-1)T(z+k-2)...T(z)) for all k commute among themselves. They generate commutative subalgebra in Yangian. The same subalgebra as coefficients of the characteristic polynomial det^{column}(1-exp(-d/dz) T(z)) .

(The subalgebra sometimes called Bethe subalgebra, since Bethe ansatz is a method to find its joint eigpairs.)

== Further questions ==
=== History ===
Manin proposed general construction of "non-commutative symmetries" in, the particular case which is called Manin matrices is discussed in, where some basic properties were outlined. The main motivation of these works was to give another look on quantum groups. Quantum matrices Fun_{q}(GL_{n}) can be defined as such matrices that T and simultaneously T^{t} are q-Manin matrices (i.e. are non-commutative symmetries of q-commuting polynomials x_{i} x_{j} = q x_{j} x_{i}. After original Manin's works there were only a few papers on Manin matrices until 2003. But around and some after this date Manin matrices appeared in several not quite related areas: obtained certain noncommutative generalization of the MacMahon master identity, which was used in knot theory; applications to quantum integrable systems, Lie algebras has been found in; generalizations of the Capelli identity involving Manin matrices appeared in. Directions proposed in these papers has been further developed.
