= Jean Berstel =

French mathematician and theoretical computer scientist

- Born: 1941 (age 84–85); Nîmes, France
- Education: Paris Diderot University
- Scientific career
- Fields: Combinatorics on words Formal language theory
- Workplaces: University of Marne-la-Vallée; Pierre and Marie Curie University
- Doctoral advisor: Marcel-Paul Schützenberger

Jean Berstel (born 1941) is a French mathematician and theoretical computer scientist known for his contributions to combinatorics on words and formal language theory. He is currently a professor emeritus at the University of Marne-la-Vallée.

== Biography ==
Berstel earned his doctorate (doctorat d'État) at Paris Diderot University in 1973. In 1973–1995 he was a professor at Pierre and Marie Curie University, and in 1995–2005 a professor at the University of Marne-la-Vallée, where he has been a professor emeritus since 2005.

In 2006, Berstel was awarded an honorary doctorate from the University of Turku, Finland. A festschrift in his honour was published in 2003 as a special issue of Theoretical Computer Science.

== Research contributions ==
Berstel has been a member of the Lothaire group of mathematicians that developed the foundations of combinatorics of words. He has published several scientific monographs, including Transductions and Context-free Languages (1979), Theory of Codes (1985, jointly with Dominique Perrin), and Codes and Automata (2009; jointly with Dominique Perrin and Christophe Reutenauer) as well as the three Lothaire books.
