= Chomsky–Schützenberger theorem =

In formal language theory, the Chomsky–Schützenberger theorem may refer to either of two different theorems derived by Noam Chomsky and Marcel-Paul Schützenberger concerning context-free languages:

- The Chomsky–Schützenberger enumeration theorem about the number of words of a given length generated by an unambiguous context-free grammar
- The Chomsky–Schützenberger representation theorem representing any context-free language by a combination of a regular language and a Dyck language
