= Moore determinant =

In mathematics, Moore determinant, named after Eliakim Hastings Moore, may refer to

- The determinant of a Moore matrix over a finite field
- The Moore determinant of a Hermitian matrix over a quaternion algebra
