= List of Jewish American philosophers =

This is an incomplete list of notable Jewish American philosophers. For other Jewish Americans, see Lists of Jewish Americans. For a list of Jewish philosophers, see Jewish philosophers.

- Marshall Berman (d. 2013)
- Max Black, analytic philosopher
- Allan Bloom
- Joseph Blau
- George Boolos
- Judith Butler
- Stanley Cavell (d. 2018)
- Joseph Cropsey
- Noam Chomsky
- Arthur Danto (d. 2013)
- Hubert Dreyfus (d. 2017)
- Paul Edwards
- Jerry Fodor
- Lewis Gordon
- Paul Gottfried
- Douglas Hofstadter
- Harry Jaffa, political philosopher
- Thomas Kuhn
- Saul Kripke
- Thomas Nagel
- Judea Pearl
- Richard Popkin
- Hilary Putnam
- Michael Walzer

== See also ==
- List of American philosophers
- List of African American philosophers

== Sources ==
- Barsky, Robert F. (1997). Noam Chomsky: A Life of Dissent. Cambridge, MA: MIT Press. ISBN 978-0-262-02418-1.
- Barsky, Robert F. (2007). The Chomsky Effect: A Radical Works Beyond the Ivory Tower. MIT Press. p. 107. ISBN 978-026202624-6 – via Internet Archive.
- Sperlich, Wolfgang B. (2006). Noam Chomsky. Reaktion Books. ISBN 978-1-86189-269-0 – via Internet Archive.
