= Chomsky (disambiguation) =

Noam Chomsky (born 1928) is an American linguist and philosopher.

Chomsky may also refer to:

- Chomsky (surname), surname list
- Chomsky (band), an American band
- Chomsky (Lyons book), a 1970 linguistics work

== See also ==
- The Anti-Chomsky Reader, 2004
- Chomsky hierarchy, for classifying formal grammars
- Chomsky normal form, a notation for formal grammars
- Chomsky–Schützenberger theorem (disambiguation)
- Decoding Chomsky, 2016
- Noam Chomsky: A Life of Dissent, 1997
