= Gesine Reinert =

Mathematics professor

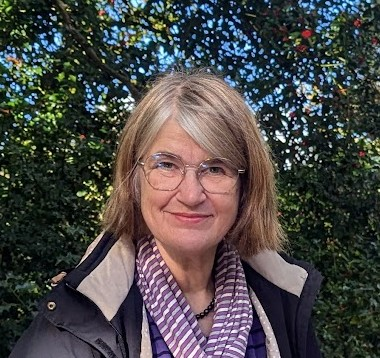
Gesine Reinert

Gesine Reinert is a German statistician who is University Professor in Statistics at the University of Oxford. She is a Fellow of Keble College, Oxford, a Fellow of the Alan Turing Institute, and a Fellow of the Institute of Mathematical Statistics. Her research concerns the probability theory and statistics of biological sequences and biological networks.

Reinert has also been associated with the M. Lothaire pseudonymous mathematical collaboration on combinatorics on words.

== Education ==
Reinert earned a diploma in mathematics from the University of Göttingen in 1989. She went on to graduate study in applied mathematics at the University of Zurich, completing her Ph.D. in 1994. Her dissertation, in probability theory, was A Weak Law of Large Numbers for Empirical Measures via Stein's Method, and Applications, and was supervised by Andrew Barbour.

== Career ==
Reinert worked as a lecturer at the University of Southern California from 1994 to 1996 and the University of California, Los Angeles from 1996 to 1998, and as a senior research fellow at King's College, Cambridge from 1998 to 2000. She joined the Oxford faculty in 2000, and was given a professorship there in 2004.
