= Véronique Bruyère =

Belgian computer scientist

Véronique Bruyère is a Belgian computer scientist working in automata theory, temporal logic, and combinatorics on words, among other topics. She is a professor of computer science at the University of Mons in Belgium.

== Education ==
Bruyère studied mathematics at the University of Mons-Hainaut, one of two universities that merged in 2009 to form the University of Mons, and earned a master's degree in mathematics there in 1985. She completed her Ph.D. in computer science in 1989, at Paris Diderot University. Her dissertation, Codes prefixes, codes a delai de dechiffrage borne, was supervised by Dominique Perrin. She also obtained a second Ph.D. in sciences from the University of Mons-Hainaut in 1991.

== Career ==
Bruyère has worked for the University of Mons-Hainaut and (after its merger) the University of Mons since 1985, when she became an assistant there. In 1993 she became chargé de cours (roughly equivalent to associate professor), in 2000 professor, and in 2012 full professor. She became head of the Theoretical Computer Science laboratory at Mons in 2001. Since 2009, she has been head of the department of computer science at the University of Mons.

== Research ==
Bruyère's research topics have included formal verification, timed automata, combinatorics on words, game theory, and coding theory. As well as publishing under her own name, she has participated as a member of the M. Lothaire pseudonymous collective.
