= Dominique Foata =

French mathematician (1934–2026)

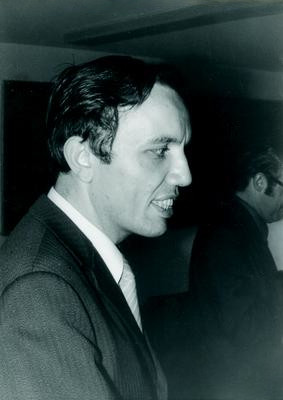
- Born: 12 October 1934; Damascus, Syria
- Died: 30 September 2026 (aged 91); Strasbourg, France
- Education: University of Paris
- Known for: Foata's transition lemma Cartier–Foata matrices Traces
- Awards: Prix Paul Doistau–Émile Blutet (1985); ICM Speaker (1983)
- Scientific career
- Fields: Mathematics
- Workplaces: University of Strasbourg
- Doctoral advisor: Marcel-Paul Schützenberger; Daniel Dugué

Dominique Foata (12 October 1934 – 30 September 2026) was a French mathematician who worked in enumerative combinatorics. With Pierre Cartier and Marcel-Paul Schützenberger he pioneered the modern approach to classical combinatorics, that led, in part, to the current blossoming of algebraic combinatorics. His pioneering work on permutation statistics, and his combinatorial approach to special functions, are especially notable. He

== Life and career ==
Foata was born in Damascus on 12 October 1934, while it was under French mandate.

He gave an invited talk at the International Congress of Mathematicians in Warsaw (1983). Among his honors are the Scientific Prize of the Union des Assurances de Paris (September 1985). With Adalbert Kerber and Volker Strehl he founded the mathematics journal Séminaire Lotharingien de Combinatoire. He is also one of the contributors of the pseudonymous collective M. Lothaire. In 1985, Foata received the Prix Paul Doistau–Émile Blutet.

Foata died in Strasbourg on 30 September 2026, at the age of 91.

== Selected publications ==
=== Books ===
- with Pierre Cartier : Problèmes combinatoires de commutation et réarrangements, Lecture Notes in Mathematics, volume 85, Springer Verlag, 1969. (Réédition électronique avec trois nouveaux appendices, by D. Foata, B. Lass & Ch. Krattenthaler.)
- with Marcel-Paul Schützenberger : Théorie géométrique des polynômes eulériens, Lecture Notes in Mathematics, volume 138, Springer Verlag, 1970. (Réédition électronique.)
- La série génératrice exponentielle dans les problèmes d'énumération, Les Presses de l´Université de Montreal, 1974.
- with Aimé Fuchs : Processus stochastiques, Dunod, 2002.
- with Jacques Franchi et Aimé Fuchs : Calcul des probabilités, 3^{e} édition, Dunod, 2012. (translated into German under the title Wahrscheinlichkeitsrechnung, by Volker Strehl. Birkhäuser Verlag AG, 1999.)

=== Articles ===
- Foata, Dominique (1968). "On the Netto inversion number of a sequence". Proc. Amer. Math. Soc. 19: 236–240. doi:10.1090/s0002-9939-1968-0223256-9. MR 0223256. S2CID 120818407.
- Foata, Dominique (1981). "Further divisibility properties of theq-tangent numbers". Proc. Amer. Math. Soc. 81 (1): 143–148. doi:10.1090/s0002-9939-1981-0589157-8. MR 0589157.
- with Pierre Leroux: Foata, Dominique; Leroux, Pierre (1983). "Polynômes de Jacobi, interprétation combinatoire et fonction génératrice". Proc. Amer. Math. Soc. 87 (1): 47–53. doi:10.2307/2044349. JSTOR 2044349. MR 0677229.
- with Doron Zeilberger: Foata, Dominique; Zeilberger, Doron (1999). "A combinatorial proof of Bass's evaluations of the Ihara-Selberg zeta functions for graphs". Trans. Amer. Math. Soc. 351 (6): 2257–2274. arXiv:math/9806037. doi:10.1090/s0002-9947-99-02234-5. MR 1487614. S2CID 6868812.
- with Guo-Niu Han: Foata, Dominique; Han, Guo-Niu (2007). "Signed words and permutations, I: A fundamental transformation". Proc. Amer. Math. Soc. 135 (1): 31–40. doi:10.1090/s0002-9939-06-08436-x. MR 2280171.
- with Guo-Niu Han: Foata, Dominique; Han, Guo-Niu (2010). "The q-tangent and q-secant numbers via basic Eulerian polynomials" (PDF). Proc. Amer. Math. Soc. 138 (2): 385–393. doi:10.1090/s0002-9939-09-10144-2. MR 2557155.

== See also ==
- MacMahon's master theorem
- Symbolic method (combinatorics)
