= Valérie Berthé =

French mathematician

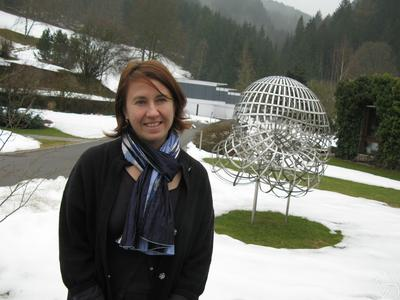
Valérie Berthé

Valérie Berthé (born 16 December 1968) is a French mathematician who works as a director of research for the Centre national de la recherche scientifique (CNRS) at the Institut de Recherche en Informatique Fondamentale (IRIF), a joint project between CNRS and Paris Diderot University. Her research involves symbolic dynamics, combinatorics on words, discrete geometry, numeral systems, tessellations, and fractals.

== Education ==
Berthé completed her baccalauréat at age 16, and studied at the École Normale Supérieure from 1988 to 1993. She earned a licentiate and master's degree in pure mathematics from Pierre and Marie Curie University in 1989, a Diplôme d'études approfondies from University of Paris-Sud in 1991, completed her agrégation in 1992, and was recruited by CNRS in 1993. Continuing her graduate studies, she defended a doctoral thesis in 1994 at the University of Bordeaux 1. Her dissertation, Fonctions de Carlitz et automates: Entropies conditionnelles was supervised by Jean-Paul Allouche. She completed a habilitation in 1999, again under the supervision of Allouche, at the University of the Mediterranean Aix-Marseille II; her habilitation thesis was Étude arithmétique et dynamique de suites algorithmiques.

== Research ==
Berthé's research spans the area of symbolic dynamics, combinatorics on words, numeration systems and discrete geometry. She has recently made significant process in the study of S-adic dynamical systems, and also of continued fractions in higher dimensions.

== Associations ==
Berthé is a vice-president of the Société mathématique de France (SMF), and director of publications for the SMF. She has played an active role in L'association femmes et mathématiques. Berthé has also been associated with the M. Lothaire pseudonymous mathematical collaboration on combinatorics on words and the Pythias Fogg pseudonymous collaboration on substitution systems.

== Recognition ==
In 2013, Berthé was elevated to the Legion of Honour.
