= Quasideterminant =

Concept in mathematics

In mathematics, the quasideterminant is a replacement for the determinant for matrices with noncommutative entries. Example 2 × 2 quasideterminants are as follows:

$$\left|\begin{array}{cc}
a_{11} & a_{12} \\
a_{21} & a_{22} \end{array}
\right|_{11} = a_{11} - a_{12}{a_{22}}^{-1}a_{21}
\qquad
\left|\begin{array}{cc}
a_{11} & a_{12} \\
a_{21} & a_{22} \end{array}
\right|_{12} = a_{12} - a_{11}{a_{21}}^{-1}a_{22}.$$

In general, there are n^{2} quasideterminants defined for an n × n matrix (one for each position in the matrix), but the presence of the inverted terms above should give the reader pause: they are not always defined, and even when they are defined, they do not reduce to determinants when the entries commute. Rather,

$$\left|A\right|_{ij} = (-1)^{i+j} \frac{\det A}{\det A^{ij}} ,$$

where $A^{ij}$ means delete the ith row and jth column from A.

The $2\times2$ examples above were introduced between 1926 and 1928 by Richardson and Heyting, but they were marginalized at the time because they were not polynomials in the entries of $A$. These examples were rediscovered and given new life in 1991 by Israel Gelfand and Vladimir Retakh. There, they develop quasideterminantal versions of many familiar determinantal properties. For example, if $B$ is built from $A$ by rescaling its $i$-th row (on the left) by $\left.\rho\right.$, then $\left|B\right|_{ij} = \rho \left|A\right|_{ij}$. Similarly, if $B$ is built from $A$ by adding a (left) multiple of the $k$-th row to another row, then $\left|B\right|_{ij} = \left|A\right|_{ij} \,\, (\forall j; \forall k\neq i)$. They even develop a quasideterminantal version of Cramer's rule.

== Definition ==
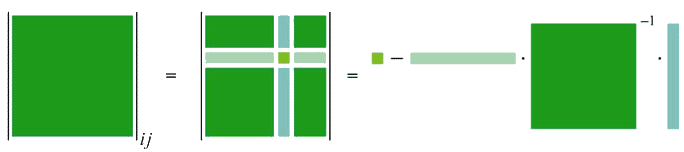
(a picture definition)

Let $A$ be an $n\times n$ matrix over a (not necessarily commutative) ring $R$ and fix $1\leq i,j\leq n$. Let $a_{ij}$ denote the ($i,j$)-entry of $A$, let $r_i^j$ denote the $i$-th row of $A$ with column $j$ deleted, and let $c_j^i$ denote the $j$-th column of $A$ with row $i$ deleted. The ($i,j$)-quasideterminant of $A$ is defined if the submatrix $A^{ij}$ is invertible over $R$. In this case,

$$\left|A\right|_{ij} = a_{ij} - r_i^j\, \bigl(A^{ij}\bigr)^{-1}\, c_j^i .$$

Recall the formula (for commutative rings) relating $A^{-1}$ to the determinant, namely $(A^{-1})_{ji} = (-1)^{i+j} \frac{\det A^{ij}}{\det A}$. The above definition is a generalization in that (even for noncommutative rings) one has

$$\bigl(A^{-1}\bigr)_{\!ji} = \left|A\right|_{ij}^{\,-1}$$

whenever the two sides makes sense.

== Identities ==
One of the most important properties of the quasideterminant is what Gelfand and Retakh call the "heredity principle". It allows one to take a quasideterminant in stages (and has no commutative counterpart). To illustrate, suppose

$$\left(\begin{array}{cc}
A_{11} & A_{12} \\
A_{21} & A_{22} \end{array}
\right)$$

is a block matrix decomposition of an $n\times n$ matrix $A$ with $A_{11}$ a $k \times k$ matrix. If the ($i,j$)-entry of $A$ lies within $A_{11}$, it says that

$$\left|A\right|_{ij} = \left|A_{11} - A_{12}\,{A_{22}}^{-1}\,A_{21}\right|_{ij}.$$

That is, the quasideterminant of a quasideterminant is a quasideterminant. To put it less succinctly: UNLIKE determinants, quasideterminants treat matrices with block-matrix entries no differently than ordinary matrices (something determinants cannot do since block-matrices generally don't commute with one another). That is, while the precise form of the above identity is quite surprising, the existence of some such identity is less so. Other identities from the papers are (i) the so-called "homological relations", stating that two quasideterminants in a common row or column are closely related to one another, and (ii) the Sylvester formula.

(i) Two quasideterminants sharing a common row or column satisfy

$$\left|A\right|_{ij} |A^{il}|_{kj}^{\,-1} = - \left|A\right|_{il} |A^{ij}|_{kl}^{\,-1}$$

or

$$|A^{kj}|_{il}^{\,-1} \left|A\right|_{ij}  = -  |A^{ij}|_{kl}^{\,-1} \left|A\right|_{kj} ,$$

respectively, for all choices $i\neq k$, $j\neq l$ so that the quasideterminants involved are defined.

(ii) Like the heredity principle, the Sylvester identity is a way to recursively compute a quasideterminant. To ease notation, we display a special case. Let $A_0$ be the upper-left $k \times k$ submatrix of an $n \times n$ matrix $A$ and fix a coordinate ($i,j$) in $A_0$. Let $B=(b_{pq})$ be the $(n-k)\times(n-k)$ matrix, with $b_{pq}$ defined as the ($p,q$)-quasideterminant of the $(k+1)\times(k+1)$ matrix formed by adjoining to $A_0$ the first $k$ columns of row $p$, the first $k$ rows of column $q$, and the entry $a$_{$pq$}. Then one has

$$\left|B\right|_{ij} = \left|A\right|_{ij} .$$

Many more identities have appeared since the first articles of Gelfand and Retakh on the subject, most of them being analogs of classical determinantal identities. An important source is Krob and Leclerc's 1995 article. To highlight one, we consider the row/column expansion identities. Fix a row $i$ to expand along. Recall the determinantal formula $\det A = \sum_l (-1)^{i+l} a_{il} \cdot \det A^{il}$. Well, it happens that quasideterminants satisfy

$$\left|A\right|_{ij} = a_{ij} - \sum_{l\neq j} a_{il}\cdot |A^{ij}|_{kl}^{\,-1} |A^{il}|_{kj}$$

(expansion along column $j$), and

$$\left|A\right|_{ij} = a_{ij} - \sum_{k\neq i} |A^{kj}|_{il} |A^{ij}|_{kl}^{\,-1}  \cdot a_{kj}$$

(expansion along row $i$).

== Connections to other determinants ==
The quasideterminant is certainly not the only existing determinant analog for noncommutative settings—perhaps the most famous examples are the Dieudonné determinant and quantum determinant. However, these are related to the quasideterminant in some way. For example,

$${\det}_q A = \bigl|A\bigr|_{11}\,\left|A^{11}\right|_{22}\,\left|A^{12,12}\right|_{33} \,\cdots\,|a_{nn}|_{nn} ,$$

with the factors on the right-hand side commuting with each other. Other famous examples, such as Berezinians, Moore and Study determinants, Capelli determinants, and Cartier-Foata-type determinants are also expressible in terms of quasideterminants. Gelfand has been known to define a (noncommutative) determinant as "good" if it may be expressed as products of quasiminors.

== Applications ==
Paraphrasing their 2005 survey article with Sergei Gelfand and Robert Wilson, Israel Gelfand and Vladimir Retakh advocate for the adoption of quasideterminants as "a main organizing tool in noncommutative algebra, giving them the same role determinants play in commutative algebra." Substantive use has been made of the quasideterminant in such fields of mathematics as integrable systems, representation theory, algebraic combinatorics, the theory of noncommutative symmetric functions, the theory of polynomials over division rings, and noncommutative geometry.

Several of the applications above make use of quasi-Plücker coordinates, which parametrize noncommutative Grassmannians and flags in much the same way as Plücker coordinates do Grassmannians and flags over commutative fields. More information on these can be found in the survey article.

== See also ==
- MacMahon Master theorem
