= M. Lothaire =

Pseudonym used by a group of mathematicians

M. Lothaire is the pseudonym of a group of mathematicians, many of whom were students of Marcel-Paul Schützenberger. The name is used as the author of several of their joint books about combinatorics on words. The group is named for Lothair I.

== Members ==
Mathematicians in the group have included Jean-Paul Allouche, Jean Berstel, Valérie Berthé, Véronique Bruyère, Julien Cassaigne, Christian Choffrut, Robert Cori, Maxime Crochemore Jacques Desarmenien, Volker Diekert, Dominique Foata, Christiane Frougny, Guo-Niu Han, Tero Harju, Philippe Jacquet, Juhani Karhumäki, Roman Kolpakov, Gregory Koucherov, Eric Laporte, Alain Lascoux, Bernard Leclerc, Aldo de Luca, Filippo Mignosi, Mehryar Mohri, Dominique Perrin, Jean-Éric Pin, Giuseppe Pirillo, Nadia Pisanti, Wojciech Plandowski, Dominique Poulalhon, Gesine Reinert, Antonio Restivo, Christophe Reutenauer, Marie-France Sagot, Jacques Sakarovitch, Gilles Schaeffer, Sophie Schbath, Marcel-Paul Schützenberger, Patrice Séébold, Imre Simon, Wojciech Szpankowski, Jean-Yves Thibon, Stefano Varricchio, and Michael Waterman.

== See also ==
- Séminaire Lotharingien de Combinatoire

== Publications ==
- Lothaire, M. (1983), Combinatorics on Words, Encyclopedia of Mathematics and its Applications, vol. 17, Addison-Wesley Publishing Co., Reading, Mass., doi:10.1017/CBO9780511566097, ISBN 978-0-201-13516-9, MR 0675953
- Lothaire, M. (2002), Algebraic Combinatorics on Words, Encyclopedia of Mathematics and its Applications, vol. 90, Cambridge University Press, ISBN 978-0-521-81220-7, MR 1905123
- Lothaire, M. (2005), Applied Combinatorics on Words, Encyclopedia of Mathematics and its Applications, vol. 105, Cambridge University Press, ISBN 978-0-521-84802-2, MR 2165687
