= Dominique Perrin =

French mathematician & theoretical computer scientist (born 1946)

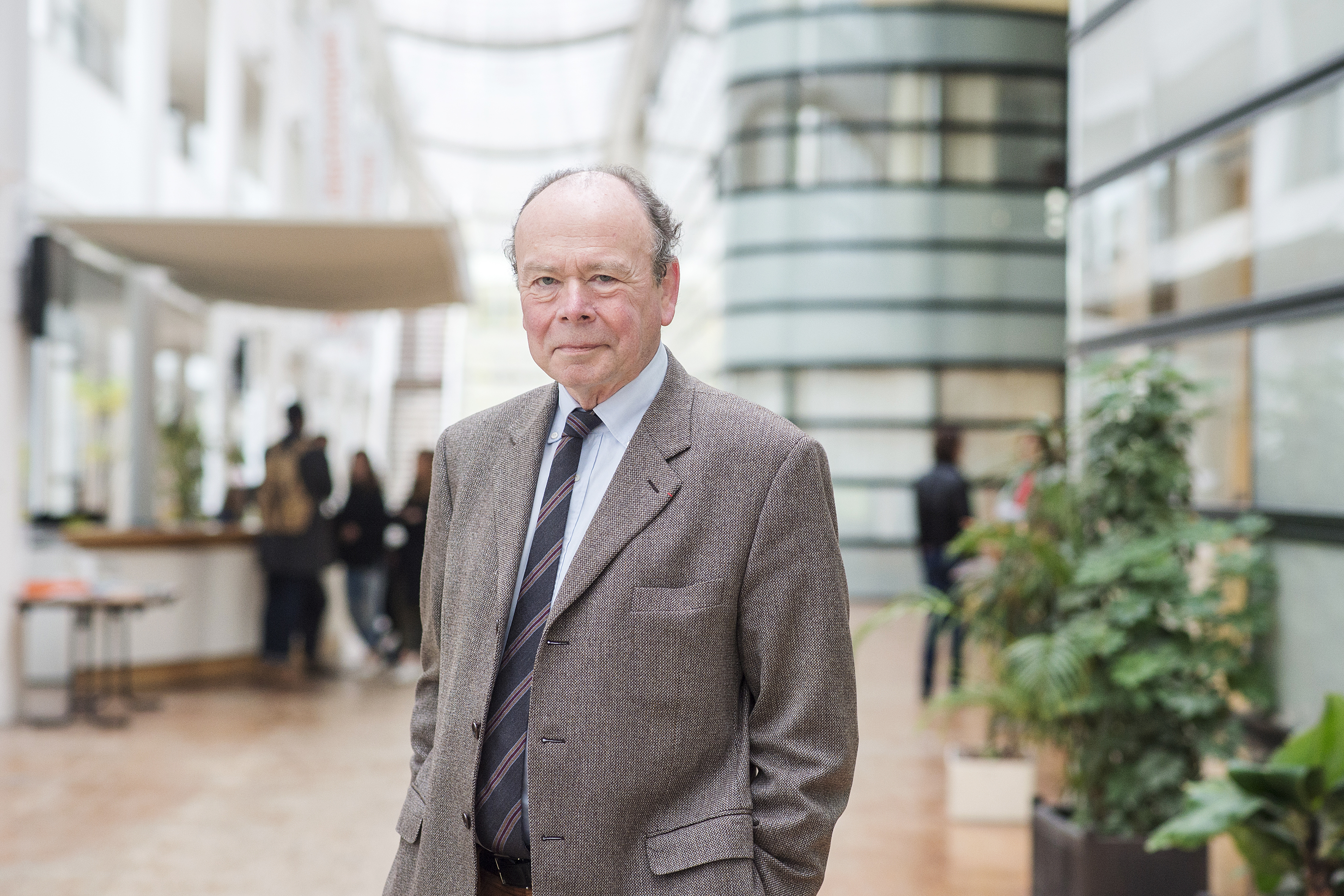
- Born: November 5, 1946 (age 79)
- Education: Paris Diderot University
- Known for: combinatorics on words coding theory
- Scientific career
- Fields: Formal language theory Combinatorics on words
- Workplaces: University of Marne-la-Vallée
- Doctoral advisor: Marcel-Paul Schützenberger
- Doctoral students: Véronique Bruyère; Maxime Crochemore

Dominique Pierre Perrin (b. 1946) is a French mathematician and theoretical computer scientist known for his contributions to coding theory and to combinatorics on words. He is a professor of the University of Marne-la-Vallée and currently serves as the President of ESIEE Paris.

== Biography ==
Perrin earned his PhD from Paris 7 University in 1975. In his early career, he was a CNRS researcher (1970–1977) and taught at the University of Chile (1972–1973). Later, he worked as a professor at the University of Rouen (1977–1983), Paris 7 University (1983–1993), and École Polytechnique (1982–2002). Since 1993, Perrin is a professor at the University of Marne-la-Vallée, and since 2004, he is the President of ESIEE Paris.

Perrin is a member of Academia Europaea since 1989.

== Scientific contributions ==
Perrin has been a member of the Lothaire group of mathematicians that developed the foundations of combinatorics on words. He has co-authored three scientific monographs: "Theory of Codes" (1985), "Codes and Automata" (2009), and "Infinite Words" (2004), as well as the three Lothaire books. Perrin has published around 50 research articles in formal language theory.
