= Juhani Karhumäki =

Finnish mathematician and theoretical computer scientist

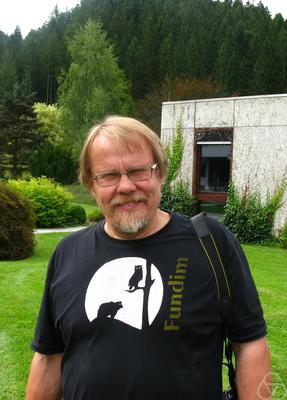
- Born: August 20, 1949 (age 77); Jyväskylän maalaiskunta, Finland
- Education: University of Turku
- Known for: combinatorics on words, equivalence problem for multitape finite automata
- Scientific career
- Fields: Theoretical computer science Automata theory Combinatorics on words
- Workplaces: University of Turku
- Doctoral advisor: Arto Salomaa

Eero Urho Juhani Karhumäki (born 1949) is a Finnish mathematician and theoretical computer scientist known for his contributions to automata theory. He is a professor at the University of Turku in southwestern Finland.

== Biography ==
Karhumäki earned his doctorate from the University of Turku in 1976. In 1980–1985, he was a junior researcher of Academy of Finland. Since 1986, he has held teaching positions at the University of Turku, attaining full professorship in 1998. In 1998–2015, Karhumäki was the head of the mathematics department at the University of Turku. He has authored altogether around 200 research papers.

Karhumäki is a member of the Finnish Academy of Science and Letters since 2000 and of Academia Europaea since 2006. A festschrift in his honour was published in 2009 as a special issue of Theoretical Computer Science.

== Research contributions ==
Karhumäki has been a member of the Lothaire group of mathematicians that developed the foundations of combinatorics of words. In 1991, jointly with Tero Harju, he solved the long-standing equivalence problem for multitape finite automata in automata theory. Karhumäki contributed to different areas of formal language theory, such as word equations, language equations and descriptional complexity of finite automata.
