= Institut Gaspard Monge =

Coordinates: 48.8392°N 2.5869°E

The Gaspard Monge Institute of electronics and computer science is the research and teaching body of the University of Marne la Vallée in the fields of computer science, electronics, telecommunications and networks. It is named for Gaspard Monge.

The Institute is composed of four branches:

- The Computing research laboratory

The fields in which the Institute carries out its research are: text algorithms, combinatorial mathematics, computer science applied to linguistics, image synthesis, networks, signal and communications. The postgraduate degree for Fundamental Computer Science can also be prepared within the framework of the laboratory.

- The laboratory of communication systems

This laboratory carries out research in the following fields: electromagnetism, applications and measures, numericals, radio communications, microsystems and microtechnologies, photonics and microwaves. The postgraduate degree in Electronics and Telecommunications can be prepared within the framework of the laboratory.

- The computer science training unit

The teachings of this University department lead to the bachelor's degree in mathematics and computer science and the postgraduate degree in computer science

- The electronics training unit

The degrees that are prepared within this unit are the bachelor's degree in material science and the postgraduate degree in electronics and telecommunications
