= Sophie Schbath =

French statistician

Sophie Schbath (born 1969) is a French statistician whose research concerns the statistics of pattern matching in strings and formal languages, particularly as applied to genomics. She is a director of research for the French National Institute for Research in Agriculture, Food, and Environment (INRAE), and a former president of the French BioInformatics Society.

== Education and career ==
Schbath was born on 19 December 1969 in Nantes. She earned a master's degree in stochastic modeling and statistics in 1992 from Paris-Sud University, and completed a Ph.D. in 1995 at Paris Descartes University. Her dissertation was Étude asymptotique du nombre d'occurrences d'un mot dans une chaîne de Markov et application à la recherche de mots de fréquence exceptionnelle dans les séquences d'ADN. She earned a habilitation in 2003 at the University of Évry Val d'Essonne.

After postdoctoral research in 1996 at the University of Southern California, Schbath became a researcher for INRAE. She became a director of research in 2006, and director of research (1st class) in 2018. She was president of the French BioInformatics Society from 2010 to 2016.

== Books ==
Schbath is the coauthor of the book ADN, mots et modèles, with S. Robin and F. Rodolphe, BELIN, 2003, translated into English as DNA, Words and Models: Statistics of Exceptional Words, Cambridge University Press, 2005.

She is also one of the contributors to the book Applied Combinatorics on Words, which lists its author as the collective pseudonym M. Lothaire.
