= Archibald Read Richardson =

British mathematician

- Born: 21 August 1881
- Died: 4 November 1954 (aged 73)
- Known for: Littlewood–Richardson rule
- Awards: FRS (1946)
- Scientific career
- Fields: Mathematics

Archibald Read Richardson FRS (21 August 1881 – 4 November 1954) was a British mathematician known for his work in algebra.

== Career ==
Richardson collaborated with Dudley E. Littlewood on invariants and group representation theory. They introduced the immanant of a matrix, studied Schur functions and developed the Littlewood–Richardson rule for their multiplication.

== Awards and honours ==
Richardson was elected a Fellow of the Royal Society on 21 March 1946.

== See also ==
- Quasideterminant
