= Alain Lascoux =

French mathematician

- Born: 17 October 1944; France
- Died: 20 October 2013 (aged 69)
- Education: University of Paris
- Awards: Albert Châtelet Medal (1990)
- Scientific career
- Fields: Mathematics
- Workplaces: Université de Paris VII; University of Marne la Vallée; Nankai University
- Doctoral advisor: Jean-Louis Verdier

Alain Lascoux (17 October 1944 – 20 October 2013) was a French mathematician at Université de Paris VII, University of Marne la Vallée and Nankai University. His research was primarily in algebraic combinatorics, particularly Hecke algebras and Young tableaux.

Lascoux earned his doctorate in 1977 from the University of Paris. He worked for twenty years with Marcel-Paul Schützenberger on properties of the symmetric group. They wrote many articles together and had a major impact on the development of algebraic combinatorics. They succeeded in giving a combinatorial understanding of various algebraic and geometric questions in representation theory. Thus they introduced many new objects related to both fields like Schubert polynomials and Grothendieck polynomials, as well as novel terminology like the plactic monoid and vexillary permutations. They were also the first to define the crystal graph structure on Young tableaux (though not under this name).

Lascoux was an invited speaker at the 1998 International Congress of Mathematicians in Berlin, Germany.

== See also ==
- LLT polynomial
