= Moore determinant of a Hermitian matrix =

Concept in mathematics

In mathematics, the Moore determinant is a determinant defined for Hermitian matrices over a quaternion algebra, introduced by Moore (1922).

Because quaternion multiplication does not commute, it is necessary to specify the order in which multiplication occurs. The Moore determinant uses the formal classical determinant, which has $n!$ terms consisting of products of elements of the matrix, and for each term specifies an order for those elements to be multiplied. Specifically, it separates out cycles of factors $a_{f_1 f_2},a_{f_2 f_3},\dots,a_{f_k f_1}$. The shortest cycles are placed first, with the smallest index within the cycle occurring first. Ties in the length of the cycle are broken by listing the cycle with the smallest $f_1$ first.

This definition has the property that the Moore determinant of a matrix formed from a suitable collection of vectors of quaternions is zero if and only if the vectors are linearly dependent.

== See also ==
- Dieudonné determinant
- quasideterminant
