= Schützenberger group =

In semigroup theory, a Schützenberger group is a group associated with a Green H-class of a semigroup. The Schützenberger groups associated with different H-classes are distinct, but the groups associated with two different H-classes contained in the same D-class of a semigroup are isomorphic. Moreover, if the H-class itself were a group, the Schützenberger group of the H-class would be isomorphic to the H-class. In fact, there are two Schützenberger groups associated with a given H-class, with each being antiisomorphic to the other.

The Schützenberger group was discovered by Marcel-Paul Schützenberger in 1957, and the terminology was coined by A. H. Clifford.

== The Schützenberger group ==
Let S be a semigroup and let S^{1} be the semigroup obtained by adjoining an identity element 1 to S (if S already has an identity element, then S^{1} = S). Green's H-relation in S is defined as follows: If a and b are in S then

a H b ⇔ there are u, v, x, y in S^{1} such that ua = ax = b and vb = by = a.

For a in S, the set of all b' s in S such that a H b is the Green H-class of S containing a, denoted by H_{a}.

Let H be an H-class of the semigroup S. Let T(H) be the set of all elements t in S^{1} such that Ht is a subset of H itself. Each t in T(H) defines a transformation, denoted by γ_{t}, of H by mapping h in H to ht in H. The set of all these transformations of H, denoted by Γ(H), is a group under composition of mappings (taking functions as right operators). The group Γ(H) is the Schützenberger group associated with the H-class H.

== Examples ==
If H is a maximal subgroup of a monoid M, then H is an H-class, and it is naturally isomorphic to its own Schützenberger group.

In general, one has that the cardinality of H and its Schützenberger group coincide for any H-class H.

== Applications ==
It is known that a monoid with finitely many left and right ideals is finitely presented (or just finitely generated) if and only if all of its Schützenberger groups are finitely presented (respectively, finitely generated). Similarly such a monoid is residually finite if and only if all of its Schützenberger groups are residually finite.
