= Séminaire Lotharingien de Combinatoire =

- Discipline: Combinatorics
- Language: English

Publication details
- Open access: Yes

Standard abbreviations
- ISO 4: Sémin. Lothar. Comb.
- MathSciNet: Sém. Lothar. Combin.

Indexing
- ISSN: 1286-4889

The Séminaire Lotharingien de Combinatoire (English: Lotharingian Seminar of Combinatorics) is a peer-reviewed academic journal specialising in combinatorial mathematics, named after Lotharingia.

It has existed since 1980 as a regular joint seminar in Combinatorics for the Universities of Bayreuth, Erlangen and Strasbourg. In 1994, it was decided to create a journal under the same name. The regular meetings continue to this day.

== See also ==
- M. Lothaire
