= Zeilberger =

Zeilberger (Hebrew: ציילברגר) may refer to:

- Doron Zeilberger (born 1950), an Israeli mathematician
  - Wilf–Zeilberger pair
  - Zeilberger-Bressoud theorem
- Johann Zeilberger (1831–1881), Austrian politician
- Rabbi Binyamin Zeilberger
