= Robert Barsky =

American comparative literature scholar

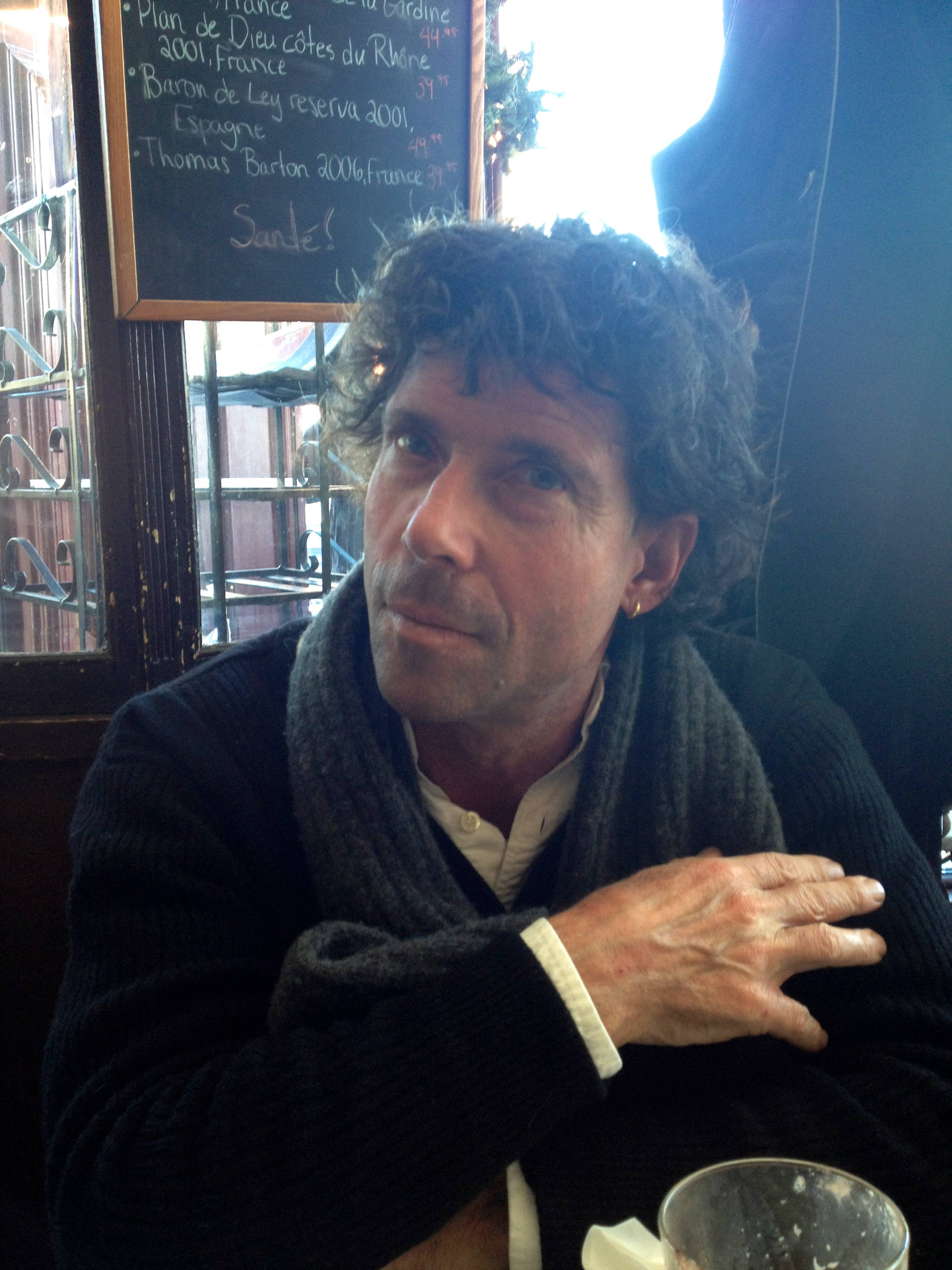
- Barsky, 2013
- Born: Robert Franklin Barsky; Montreal, Canada
- Occupations: Professor, author

Academic background
- Education: Université libre de Bruxelles

Academic work
- Discipline: French and European Studies, and Jewish Studies
- Sub-discipline: Immigration and immigration law, linguistics, "Law, Narrative, and Border Crossing"
- Institutions: Vanderbilt University
- Main interests: "Law, Narrative, and Border Crossing"
- Notable works: Noam Chomsky: A Life of Dissent, 1997
- Website: my.vanderbilt.edu/robertbarsky/

Robert Franklin Barsky is Canada Research Chair in Law, Narrative, and Border Crossing. He is a professor in the College of Arts and Science and Associate Faculty in the School of Law at Vanderbilt University in Nashville, Tennessee. He is an expert on Noam Chomsky, literary theory, convention refugees, immigration and refugee law, borders, work through the Americas, and Montreal. His biography of Chomsky titled Noam Chomsky: A Life of Dissent was published in 1997 by MIT Press, followed in 2007 by The Chomsky Effect: A Radical Works Beyond the Ivory Tower, and in 2011 by a biography of Chomsky's teacher Zellig Harris: From American Linguistics to Socialist Zionism. His most recent books are Undocumented Immigrants in an Era of Arbitrary Law and Hatched!, a novel.

== Background ==
Barsky was born and raised in Montreal. He attended Brandeis University in Waltham, Massachusetts, and after graduating moved to Verbier, Switzerland with the intention of pursuing a career in skiing. In 1985, he returned to Canada to undertake graduate work at McGill University in Montreal, first on Lord Byron and then, following-up on his work as a transcriber of refugee hearings, on the discourse of convention refugees for a PhD in Comparative Literature. After the PhD he continued work for the Institut national de la recherche scientifique (INRS), before taking up a post-doc with Michel Meyer on rhetoric and argumentation at l'Université libre de Bruxelles, in Belgium.

== Work ==
Barsky is the author or editor of numerous books on narrative and refugee law ("Undocumented Immigrants in an Era of Arbitrary Law: The Flight and Plight of Peoples Deemed 'Illegal', Constructing a Productive Other: Discourse Theory and the Convention Refugee Hearing and Arguing and Justifying: Assessing the Convention Refugees' Choice of Moment, Motive and Host Country), on radical theory and practice ("Zellig Harris: From American Linguistics to Socialist Zionism", The Chomsky Effect: A Radical Works Beyond the Ivory Tower, Noam Chomsky: A Life of Dissent and an edition of Anton Pannekoek's Workers Councils) on discourse and literary theory (Introduction à la théorie littéraire, an edited volume with Michael Holquist titled Bakhtin and Otherness, an edited collection with Eric Méchoulan titled The Production of French Criticism, an edited collection titled Marc Angenot and the Scandal of History, an edited collection with Saleem Ali for www.ameriquests.org on "Quests Beyond the Ivory Tower: Public Intellectuals, Academia and the Media") and on translation — in both theory and practice (including the translation of Michel Meyer's Philosophy and the Passions). He has been involved with a range of journals, including SubStance, for which he served as an editor, and he is the founder of 415 South Street, a literary magazine at Brandeis University, Discours social/Social Discourse, and the international on-line journal AmeriQuests. His novel, "Hatched", appeared in 2016.

Barsky has been the Canadian Bicentennial Visiting Professor at Yale University, a visiting professor at the Institute for Advanced Studies, Toulouse, the Law School of the VU Amsterdam, under the auspices of the Dutch Royal Society, and the Institute for Advanced Studies in the Humanities, University of Edinburgh. He is the faculty director of the W.T. Bandy Center, the founding director of Quebec and Canadian Studies, and the co-director, with Daniel Gervais, of the Literature and Law Seminar at the Robert Penn Warren Center.

== Bibliography ==
- Barsky, Robert Franklin (1997). Noam Chomsky: A Life of Dissent. Cambridge, Massachusetts: MIT Press. ISBN 978-1-55022-282-1.
- Barsky, Robert F. (2007). The Chomsky Effect: A Radical Works Beyond the Ivory Tower. Cambridge, Mass: MIT Press. ISBN 978-0-262-02624-6.
- Barsky, Robert F. (2011). Zellig Harris: From American Linguistics to Socialist Zionism. MIT Press. ISBN 978-0-262-29447-8.
