= E. H. Moore =

American mathematician (1862–1932)

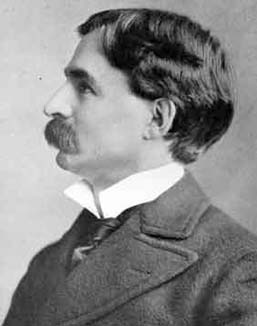
- Eliakim Hastings Moore
- Born: January 26, 1862; Marietta, Ohio, U.S.
- Died: December 30, 1932 (aged 70); Chicago, Illinois, United States
- Education: Yale University (BA, PhD)
- Known for: "General analysis", Moore–Smith convergence of nets in topology, Moore family and hull operator, Moore–Penrose inverse, Galois representation of finite fields, Axiomatic systems
- Awards: AMS Colloquium Lecturer, 1906
- Scientific career
- Fields: Mathematics
- Workplaces: University of Chicago 1892–1931; Yale University 1887–89; Northwestern University 1886–87, 1889–92
- Thesis: Extensions of Certain Theorems of Clifford and Cayley in the Geometry of n Dimensions (1885)
- Doctoral advisor: Hubert Anson Newton
- Doctoral students: George Birkhoff; Leonard Dickson; T. H. Hildebrandt; D. N. Lehmer; Robert Lee Moore; Oswald Veblen; Anna Wheeler
- Other notable students: Anne Bosworth

Eliakim Hastings Moore (/ɪˈlaɪəkɪm/; January 26, 1862 – December 30, 1932), usually cited as E. H. Moore or E. Hastings Moore, was an American mathematician.

== Life ==
Moore, the son of a Methodist minister and grandson of US Congressman Eliakim H. Moore, discovered mathematics through a summer job at the Cincinnati Observatory while in high school. He subsequently studied mathematics at Yale University, where he was a member of Skull and Bones and obtained a BA in 1883 and the PhD in 1885 with a thesis supervised by Hubert Anson Newton, on some work of William Kingdon Clifford and Arthur Cayley. Newton encouraged Moore to study in Germany, and thus he spent an academic year at the University of Berlin, attending lectures by Leopold Kronecker and Karl Weierstrass.

On his return to the United States, Moore taught at Yale and at Northwestern University. When the University of Chicago opened its doors in 1892, Moore was the first head of its mathematics department, a position he retained until his death in 1932. His first two colleagues were Oskar Bolza and Heinrich Maschke. The resulting department was the second research-oriented mathematics department in American history, after Johns Hopkins University.

== Accomplishments ==
Moore first worked in abstract algebra, proving in 1893 the classification of the structure of finite fields (also called Galois fields). Around 1900, he began working on the foundations of geometry. He reformulated Hilbert's axioms for geometry so that points were the only primitive notion, thus turning David Hilbert's primitive lines and planes into defined notions. In 1902, he further showed that one of Hilbert's axioms for geometry was redundant. His work on axiom systems is considered one of the starting points for metamathematics and model theory. After 1906, he turned to the foundations of analysis. The concept of a closure operator first appeared in his 1910 Introduction to a form of general analysis. He also wrote on algebraic geometry, number theory, and integral equations.

At Chicago, Moore supervised 31 doctoral dissertations, including those of George Birkhoff, Leonard Dickson, Robert Lee Moore (no relation), and Oswald Veblen. Birkhoff and Veblen went on to lead departments at Harvard and Princeton, respectively. Dickson became the first great American algebraist and number theorist. Robert Moore founded American topology. According to the Mathematics Genealogy Project, as of December 2023, E. H. Moore had 29,982 known "descendants."

Moore convinced the New York Mathematical Society to change its name to the American Mathematical Society, whose Chicago branch he led. He presided over the AMS, 1901–02, and edited the Transactions of the American Mathematical Society, 1899–1907. He was elected to the National Academy of Sciences, the American Academy of Arts and Sciences, and the American Philosophical Society. He was an Invited Speaker at the International Congress of Mathematicians in 1908 in Rome and in 1912 in Cambridge, England.

In 2002, the American Mathematical Society established the E. H. Moore Research Article Prize in his honor.

== See also ==
- Moore–Penrose inverse
- Moore–Smith sequence
- Moore matrix over a finite field
- Moore determinant of a Hermitian matrix over a quaternion algebra
