= Anne Ancelin Schützenberger =

French psychotherapist

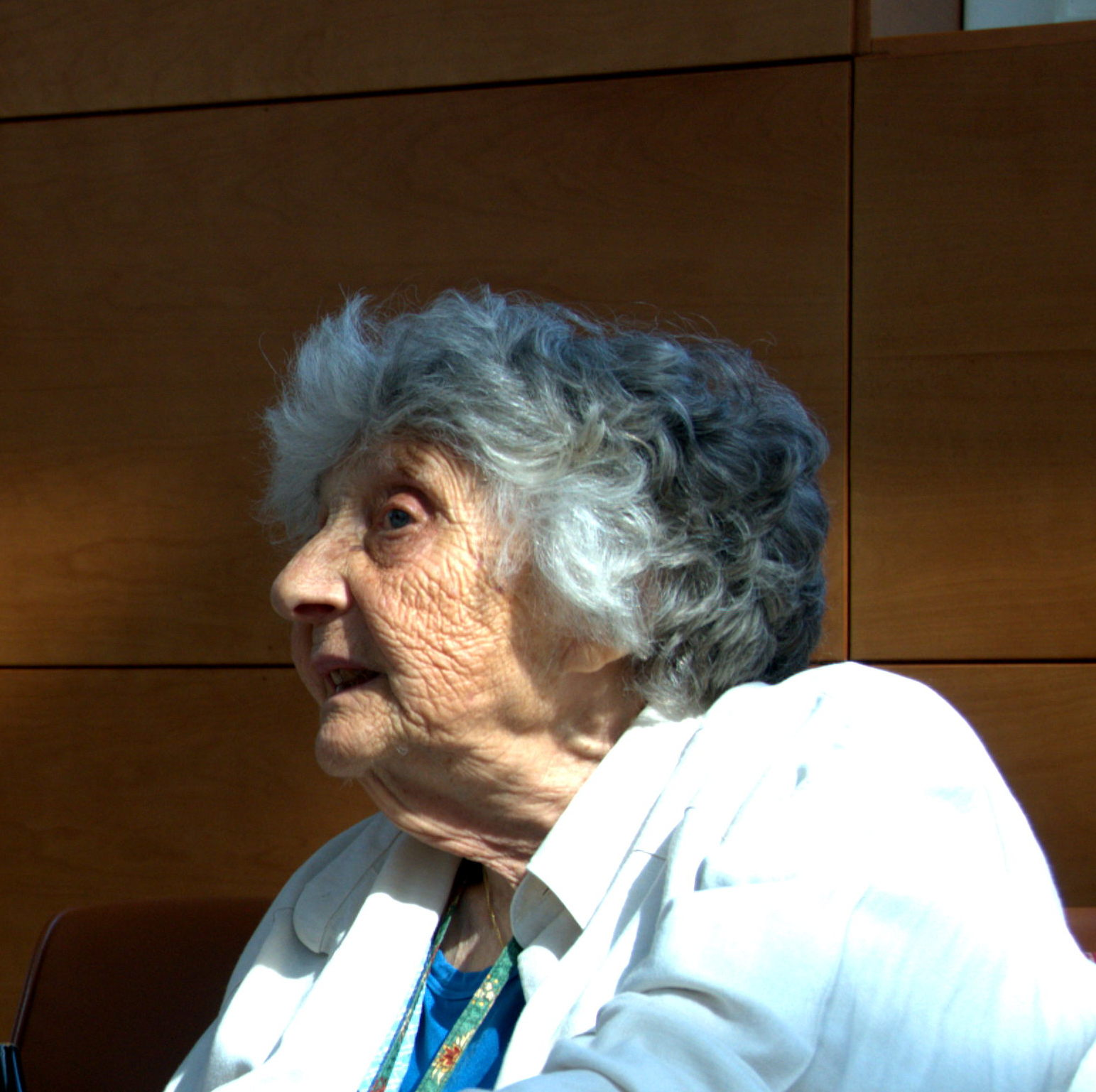
- Anne Ancelin Schützenberger (2009)
- Born: March 29, 1919
- Died: March 23, 2018 (aged 98)

Anne Ancelin Schützenberger (29 March 1919 – 23 March 2018) was a French psychologist and psychotherapist. During the Second World War she was a member of the French Resistance.

She became a prominent representative of psychodrama, being a student of Jacob L. Moreno.

== Biography ==
She was born in Moscow, into an Ashkenazi Jewish family, but grew up in Paris, where she received her education, leading eventually to doctorates in literature and psychology. As a result of her Resistance activities, she became regional secretary of the newly-formed Mouvement de libération nationale in 1944, and on 6 June of the same year her home was burned down by the 2nd SS Panzer Division Das Reich. Having gained experience working on the MLN's journal, in 1947 she launched the Bulletin de Psychologie des Étudiants de l'Université de Paris, which she later edited, producing the first issue in the kitchen of her apartment.

On 30 August 1948, she married the mathematician Marcel-Paul Schützenberger in London; they had one daughter, Hélène, but divorced soon afterwards. Through her husband she came into contact with Claude Lévi-Strauss. A Fulbright scholarship enabled her to study under Jacob L. Moreno in New York, and they remained friends until his death. During her time overseas, she worked with Carl Rogers, Margaret Mead, Gregory Bateson and Paul Watzlawick, among others. In Paris, she underwent traditional psychotherapy with Robert Gessain and Françoise Dolto.

In 1973 she co-founded the International Association of Group Psychotherapy (IAGP), becoming its first General Secretary and Vice President; in 2003 she became its “Honorary Archivist". In 1989, she founded the École Française de Psychodrame, where she taught psychodrama.

In 2014 she Founded the @Anne Ancelin Schutzenberger International School of Psychogenealogy and Transgenerational Therapy, together with Manuela Maciel Yaacov Naor and Leandra Perrotta.

From 1967, she was director of research at the laboratory of social psychology research at the University of Nice. At the time of her death, she was Emeritus Professor there, although she had given up teaching at the age of 86. She was just short of her 99th birthday and was buried at Boulogne-Billancourt.

== Published works ==
- [Doctoral thesis, Paris, Sorbonne, 1976, Université de Paris VII, Atelier de reproduction des thèses, Université de Lille III. Paris, Diffusion Librairie Champion, 2 vol., 845 p.].
- Contribution à l’étude de la communication non verbale, 1978.
- Le Jeu de rôle, Paris, ESF, 1981, (5th ed., 1999).
- Vouloir guérir, l’aide au malade atteint d’un cancer, Paris, Desclée de Brouwer, 1985, 9th ed., 2004.
- Aïe, mes aïeux ! Liens transgénérationnels, secrets de famille, syndrome d’anniversaire, transmission des traumatismes et pratique du génosociogramme Paris, Desclée de Brouwer, 1988. (16th ed, 2007) [Translated into English, German, Russian, Portuguese, Spanish and Italian].
- The Ancestor Syndrome. Routledge, 1998.
- Précis de psychodrame. Introduction aux aspects techniques. Paris, Éditions Universitaires, revised ed. 1972, 261 p. [Réédition revue et complétée, Le Psychodrame, Paris, Payot, 2003. [Traductions allemande, italienne, espagnol, suédoise, japonaise, turque (1980)].
- Le Psychodrame, Paris, Payot, 2003.
- Les secrets de famille, les non dits, et le syndrome d'anniversaire in Transmissions, Joyce Ain, dir. Toulouse, Erès, 2003.
- Avec Ghislain Devroede, Ces Enfants malades de leurs parents, Paris, Payot, 2003.
- Sortir du deuil, surmonter son chagrin et réapprendre à vivre avec Evelyne Bissone Jeufroy, Paris, Payot, 2005.
- Avec Ghislain Devroede, Suffering in Silence, the legacy of unresolved sexual abuse, 2005.
- Contributions à une histoire de vie in Vincent de Gaulejac, dir. et coll., 2003-2004.
- Histoire de vie et choix théoriques - Femmes et Sciences Sociales - «Changement Social», Paris, L'Harmattan.
- « Le Genosociogramme. Introduction à la psychologie transgénérationnelle » in « Le Genogramme », numéro spécial des Cahiers critiques de thérapie familiale et pratique de réseaux, Bruxelles, 2000, no 25, pp. 61–83.
- Psychogénéalogie. Guérir les blessures familiales et se retrouver soi, Paris, Payot, 2007.
- Le Plaisir de vivre, Paris, Payot, 2009.
- Exercices pratiques de psychogénéalogie, Paris, Payot, 2011.
- Ici et maintenant. Vivons pleinement, Paris, Payot, 2013.
- La Langue secrète du corps, Paris, Payot, 2015.
