= Chomsky–Schützenberger representation theorem =

Representing a given context-free language in terms of two simpler languages

In formal language theory, the Chomsky–Schützenberger representation theorem is a theorem derived by Noam Chomsky and Marcel-Paul Schützenberger in 1959 about representing a given context-free language in terms of two simpler languages. These two simpler languages, namely a regular language and a Dyck language, are combined by means of an intersection and a homomorphism.

Proofs of this theorem are found in several textbooks, e.g. Autebert, Berstel & Boasson (1997) or Davis, Sigal & Weyuker (1994).

== Mathematics ==
=== Notation ===
A few notions from formal language theory are in order.

A context-free language is regular, if it can be described by a regular expression, or, equivalently, if it is accepted by a finite automaton.

A homomorphism is based on a function $h$ which maps symbols from an alphabet $\Gamma$ to words over another alphabet $\Sigma$; If the domain of this function is extended to words over $\Gamma$ in the natural way, by letting $h(xy)=h(x)h(y)$ for all words $x$ and $y$, this yields a homomorphism $h:\Gamma^*\to \Sigma^*$.

A matched alphabet $T \cup \overline T$ is an alphabet with two equal-sized sets; it is convenient to think of it as a set of parentheses types, where $T$ contains the opening parenthesis symbols, whereas the symbols in $\overline T$ contains the closing parenthesis symbols. For a matched alphabet $T \cup \overline T$, the typed Dyck language $D_T$ is given by

$$D_T = \{\,w \in (T \cup \overline T)^* \mid w \text{ is a correctly nested sequence of parentheses} \,\}.$$

For example, the following is a valid sentence in the 3-typed Dyck language:

( [ [ ] { } ] ( ) { ( ) } )

=== Theorem ===
A language L over the alphabet $\Sigma$ is context-free if and only if there exists

- a matched alphabet $T \cup \overline T$
- a regular language $R$ over $T \cup \overline T$,
- and a homomorphism $h : (T \cup \overline T)^* \to \Sigma^*$
such that $L = h(D_T \cap R)$.

We can interpret this as saying that any CFG language can be generated by first generating a typed Dyck language, filtering it by a regular grammar, and finally converting each bracket into a word in the CFG language.
