= Dieudonné determinant =

In linear algebra, the Dieudonné determinant is a generalization of the determinant of a matrix to matrices over division rings and local rings. It was introduced by Dieudonné (1943).

If K is a division ring, then the Dieudonné determinant is a group homomorphism from the group GL_{n}(K ) of invertible n-by-n matrices over K onto the abelianization K^{×}/ [K^{×}, K^{×}] of the multiplicative group K^{×} of K.

For example, the Dieudonné determinant for a 2-by-2 matrix is the residue class, in K^{×}/ [K^{×}, K^{×}], of

$$\det \left({\begin{array}{*{20}c} a & b \\ c & d \end{array}}\right) =
\left\lbrace{\begin{array}{*{20}c} -cb & \text{if } a = 0 \\ ad - aca^{-1}b & \text{if } a \ne 0. \end{array}}\right.$$

== Properties ==
Let R be a local ring. There is a determinant map from the matrix ring GL(R ) to the abelianised unit group R^{×}_{ab} with the following properties:

- The determinant is invariant under elementary row operations
- The determinant of the identity matrix is 1
- If a row is left multiplied by a in R^{×} then the determinant is left multiplied by a
- The determinant is multiplicative: det(AB) = det(A)det(B)
- If two rows are exchanged, the determinant is multiplied by −1
- If R is commutative, then the determinant is invariant under transposition

== Tannaka–Artin problem ==
Assume that K is finite over its center F. The reduced norm gives a homomorphism N_{n} from GL_{n}(K ) to F^{×}. We also have a homomorphism from GL_{n}(K ) to F^{×} obtained by composing the Dieudonné determinant from GL_{n}(K ) to K^{×}/ [K^{×}, K^{×}] with the reduced norm N_{1} from GL_{1}(K ) = K^{×} to F^{×} via the abelianization.

The Tannaka–Artin problem is whether these two maps have the same kernel SL_{n}(K ). This is true when F is locally compact but false in general.

== See also ==
- Moore determinant over a division algebra
