= Noam Chomsky: A Life of Dissent =

1997 biography by Robert Barsky

- Author: Robert F. Barsky
- Subject: Biography
- Publisher: The MIT Press
- Publication date: February 1997
- Pages: 256
- ISBN: 9780262024181

Noam Chomsky: A Life of Dissent is a 1997 biography of Noam Chomsky written by Robert Barsky and published by The MIT Press.

== Bibliography ==
- Freeman, Donald C. (1998). "Review of Noam Chomsky: A Life of Dissent". Isis. 89 (3): 567–568. doi:10.1086/384133. ISSN 0021-1753. JSTOR 237202.
- Goldsmith, John (1998). "Noam Chomsky: A life of dissent". Journal of the History of the Behavioral Sciences. 34 (2): 173–180. doi:10.1002/(SICI)1520-6696(199821)34:2<173::AID-JHBS5>3.0.CO;2-T. ISSN 1520-6696.
- Harpham, Geoffrey Galt (1999). Barsky, Robert F. (ed.). "Chomsky and the Rest of Us". Salmagundi (121/122): 211–237. ISSN 0036-3529. JSTOR 40549121.
- Knapp, Terry J. (April 1997). "Meeting the Enemy: An Essay Review of Noam Chomsky : A Life of Dissent by Robert F. Barsky". The Analysis of Verbal Behavior. 14 (1): 105–109. doi:10.1007/BF03392918. ISSN 0889-9401. PMC 2748567. PMID 22477122.
- Narasimhan, R. (1997). "Review of Noam Chomsky: A Life of Dissent". Current Science. 73 (3): 299–300. ISSN 0011-3891. JSTOR 24100604.
- Szanto, George (1998). "Review of Noam Chomsky: A Life of Dissent". SubStance. 27 (2): 128–131. doi:10.2307/3685654. ISSN 0049-2426. JSTOR 3685654.
