= Marcel-Paul Schützenberger =

French mathematician (1920–1996)

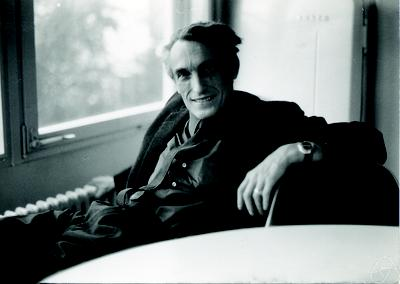
- Schützenberger in 1972
- Born: 24 October 1920; Paris
- Died: 29 July 1996 (aged 75); Paris
- Education: University of Paris
- Known for: Schutzenberger group; Weighted automaton; Plactic monoid; Chomsky–Schützenberger hierarchy; Chomsky–Schützenberger enumeration theorem; Chomsky–Schützenberger representation theorem
- Scientific career
- Fields: Mathematics
- Workplaces: University of Paris
- Doctoral advisor: Georges Darmois; Albert Châtelet
- Doctoral students: Jean Berstel; Dominique Foata; Alain Lascoux; Maurice Nivat; Dominique Perrin

Marcel-Paul "Marco" Schützenberger (24 October 1920 – 29 July 1996) was a French mathematician and Doctor of Medicine. He worked in the fields of formal language, combinatorics, and information theory. In addition to his formal results in mathematics, he was "deeply involved in [a] struggle against the votaries of [neo-]Darwinism", a stance which has resulted in some mixed reactions from his peers and from critics of his stance on evolution. Several notable theorems and objects in mathematics as well as computer science bear his name (for example Schutzenberger group or the Chomsky–Schützenberger hierarchy). Paul Schützenberger was his great-grandfather.

In the late 1940s, he was briefly married to the psychologist Anne Ancelin Schützenberger.

== Contributions to medicine and biology ==
Schützenberger's first doctorate, in medicine, was awarded in 1948 from the Faculté de Médecine de Paris. His doctoral thesis, on the statistical study of biological sex at birth, was distinguished by the Baron Larrey Prize from the French Academy of Medicine.

Biologist Jaques Besson, a co-author with Schützenberger on a biological topic, while noting that Schützenberger is perhaps most remembered for work in pure mathematical fields, credits him for likely being responsible for the introduction of statistical sequential analysis in French hospital practice.

== Contributions to mathematics, computer science, and linguistics ==
Schützenberger's second doctorate was awarded in 1953 through the Paris Institute of Statistics. This work, developed from earlier results is counted amongst the early influential French academic work in information theory. His later impact in both linguistics and combinatorics is reflected by two theorems in formal linguistics (the Chomsky–Schützenberger enumeration theorem and the Chomsky–Schützenberger representation theorem), and one in combinatorics (the Schützenberger theorem). With Alain Lascoux, Schützenberger is credited with the foundation of the notion of the plactic monoid, reflected in the name of the combinatorial structure called by some the Lascoux–Schützenberger tree. Relatedly, they invented Schubert polynomials.

In automata theory, Schützenberger is credited with first defining (what later became known as) weighted automata, the first studied model of automata which compute a quantitative output.

The mathematician Dominique Perrin credited Schützenberger with "deeply [influencing] the theory of semigroups" and "deep results on rational functions and transducers", amongst other contributions to mathematics.

== Offices, honors, and recognitions ==
Professorships and other teaching

- Professor in the Faculty of Sciences at the University of Poitiers (1957–1963)
- Lecturer in the Faculty of Medicine at Harvard University (1961–1962)
- Director of Research at the CNRS (1963–1964)
- Professor at the University of Paris (1964–1970)
- Professor in the Faculty of Sciences at the University of Paris VII (1970-until his death in 1996)

National honors

- In 1988, after having been a Correspondant since 1979, Schützenberger was made a full Membre of French Academy of Sciences.

Posthumous recognitions

After his death, two journals in theoretical mathematics dedicated issues to Schützenberger's memory. He was commemorated in this manner by Theoretical Computer Science in 1998 and again by the International Journal of Algebra and Computation in 1999.

The mathematician David Berlinski provided this dedication in his 2000 book The Advent of The Algorithm: The Idea that Rules the World: À la mémoire de mon ami . . M. P. Schützenberger, 1921–1996.

== Trivia ==
- The character "Dr. Schütz" in Boris Vian's 1948 novel, Et on tuera tous les affreux, is said to have been inspired by Schützenberger.
- Together with many of his students, Schützenberger is one of the contributors of the pseudonymous collective M. Lothaire.

== Works ==
For the complete list of his papers, see: Papers

- De la diversité de certains cancers. Pierre Florent Denoix, Paris (1954)/About the diversity of some cancers
- Théorie géométrique des polynômes eulériens, with Dominique Foata, Berlin, Heidelberg, New York, Springer (1970)/Geometric theory of Euler polynomials
- Triangle de pensées, with Alain Connes and André Lichnerowicz, Paris, O. Jacob; Saint-Gély du Fesc : Espace 34 (2000)/Triangle of thoughts
- Les failles du darwinisme, La Recherche, n°283 (January 1996)/The miracles of darwinism
- Œuvres complètes, edited by Jean Berstel, Alain Lascoux and Dominique Perrin, Institut Gaspard-Monge, Université Paris-Est (2009)/Complete Works

The Complete Works of Marcel-Paul Schützenberger: Complete Works

== See also ==
- Jeu de taquin
