= University of Paris-Est Marne-la-Vallée =

French university in Marne-la-Vallée

Coordinates: 48°50′21.1″N 2°35′12.9″E

Université Paris-Est Marne-la-Vallée
- Université Paris-Est Marne-la-Vallée
- Type: Public
- Active: 1991–2020
- President: Gilles Roussel
- Academic staff: 285
- Administrative staff: 894
- Students: 11,000
- Location: Marne la Vallée, France
- Campus: Urban
- Website: www.u-pem.fr

The Université Paris-Est Marne-la-Vallée, or commonly known as UPEM, was a French university, in the Academy of Créteil. The main campus was located at Champs-sur-Marne. In 2020, UPEM merged with other facilities in the Descartes Campus to become Gustave Eiffel University.

== History ==
UPEM was founded in 1991. In 2020, UPEM was to merge with other facilities in the Descartes Campus to become Gustave Eiffel University.

== Notable faculty ==
- Corine Pelluchon (born 1967), philosopher

== See also ==
- Institut Gaspard Monge
- List of public universities in France by academy
- Paris-Est Sup University Group
