= Affine symmetric group =

Number line and triangular tiling's symmetry mathematical structure

The regular triangular tiling of the plane, whose symmetries are described by the affine symmetric group S̃_{3}

The affine symmetric groups are a family of mathematical structures that describe the symmetries of the number line and the regular triangular tiling of the plane, as well as related higher-dimensional objects. In addition to this geometric description, the affine symmetric groups may be defined in other ways: as collections of permutations (rearrangements) of the integers (..., −2, −1, 0, 1, 2, ...) that are periodic in a certain sense, or in purely algebraic terms as a group with certain generators and relations. They are studied in combinatorics and representation theory.

A finite symmetric group consists of all permutations of a finite set. Each affine symmetric group is an infinite extension of a finite symmetric group. Many important combinatorial properties of the finite symmetric groups can be extended to the corresponding affine symmetric groups. Permutation statistics such as descents and inversions can be defined in the affine case. As in the finite case, the natural combinatorial definitions for these statistics also have a geometric interpretation.

The affine symmetric groups have close relationships with other mathematical objects, including juggling patterns and certain complex reflection groups. Many of their combinatorial and geometric properties extend to the broader family of affine Coxeter groups.

== Definitions ==
The affine symmetric group may be equivalently defined as an abstract group by generators and relations, or in terms of concrete geometric and combinatorial models.

=== Algebraic definition ===
Dynkin diagrams for the affine symmetric groups on 2 and more than 2 generators

One way of defining groups is by generators and relations. In this type of definition, generators are a subset of group elements that, when combined, produce all other elements. The relations of the definition are a system of equations that determine when two combinations of generators are equal. (Note: More precisely, every relation between generators can be explained by the given relations, so that the group is the largest among all groups whose generators satisfy the given relations. The formal version of this definition is given in terms of quotients of free groups.) In this way, the affine symmetric group $\widetilde{S}_n$ is generated by a set
$$s_0, s_1, \ldots, s_{n - 1}$$
of n elements that satisfy the following relations: when $n \geq 3$,

1. $s_i^2 = 1$ (the generators are involutions),
2. $s_is_j = s_js_i$ if j is not one of $i - 1, i, i + 1$, indicating that for these pairs of generators, the group operation is commutative, and
3. $s_is_{i + 1}s_i = s_{i + 1}s_is_{i + 1}$.

In the relations above, indices are taken modulo n, so that the third relation includes as a particular case $s_0s_{n - 1}s_0 = s_{n - 1}s_0s_{n - 1}$. (The second and third relation are sometimes called the braid relations.) When $n = 2$, the affine symmetric group $\widetilde{S}_2$ is the infinite dihedral group generated by two elements $s_0, s_1$ subject only to the relations $s_0^2 = s_1^2 = 1$.

These relations can be rewritten in the special form that defines the Coxeter groups, so the affine symmetric groups are Coxeter groups, with the $s_i$ as their Coxeter generating sets. Each Coxeter group may be represented by a Coxeter–Dynkin diagram, in which vertices correspond to generators and edges encode the relations between them. For $n \geq 3$, the Coxeter–Dynkin diagram of $\widetilde{S}_n$ is the n-cycle (where the edges correspond to the relations between pairs of consecutive generators and the absence of an edge between other pairs of generators indicates that they commute), while for $n = 2$ it consists of two nodes joined by an edge labeled $\infty$.

=== Geometric definition ===
When n = 3, the space V is a two-dimensional plane and the reflections are across lines. The points of the root lattice Λ are circled.

In the Euclidean space $\R^{n}$ with coordinates $(x_1, \ldots, x_n)$, the set V of points for which $x_1 + x_2 + \cdots + x_n = 0$ forms a (hyper)plane, an (n − 1)-dimensional subspace. For every pair of distinct elements i and j of $\{1, \ldots, n\}$ and every integer k, the set of points in V that satisfy $x_i - x_j = k$ forms an (n − 2)-dimensional subspace within V, and there is a unique reflection of V that fixes this subspace. Then the affine symmetric group $\widetilde{S}_n$ can be realized geometrically as a collection of maps from V to itself, the compositions of these reflections.

Inside V, the subset of points with integer coordinates forms the root lattice, Λ. It is the set of all the integer vectors $(a_1, \ldots, a_n)$ such that $a_1 + \cdots + a_n = 0$. Each reflection preserves this lattice, and so the lattice is preserved by the whole group.

The fixed subspaces of these reflections divide V into congruent simplices, called alcoves. The situation when $n = 3$ is shown in the figure; in this case, the root lattice is a triangular lattice, the reflecting lines divide V into equilateral triangle alcoves, and the roots are the centers of nonoverlapping hexagons made up of six triangular alcoves.

Reflections and alcoves for the affine symmetric group. The fundamental alcove is shaded.

To translate between the geometric and algebraic definitions, one fixes an alcove and consider the n hyperplanes that form its boundary. The reflections through these boundary hyperplanes may be identified with the Coxeter generators. In particular, there is a unique alcove (the fundamental alcove) consisting of points $(x_1, \ldots, x_n)$ such that $x_1 \geq x_2 \geq \cdots \geq x_n \geq x_1 - 1$, which is bounded by the hyperplanes $x_1 - x_2 = 0,$ $x_2 - x_3 = 0,$ ..., and $x_1 - x_n = 1,$ illustrated in the case $n = 3$. For $i = 1, \ldots, n- 1$, one may identify the reflection through $x_i - x_{i + 1} = 0$ with the Coxeter generator $s_i$, and also identify the reflection through $x_1 - x_n = 1$ with the generator $s_0 = s_n$.

=== Combinatorial definition ===
The elements of the affine symmetric group may be realized as a group of periodic permutations of the integers. In particular, say that a function $u \colon \Z \to \Z$ is an affine permutation if

- it is a bijection (each integer appears as the value of $u(x)$ for exactly one $x$),
- $u(x + n) = u(x) + n$ for all integers x (the function is equivariant under shifting by $n$), and
- $u(1) + u(2) + \cdots + u(n) = 1 + 2 + \cdots + n = \frac{n(n + 1)}{2}$, the $n$th triangular number.

For every affine permutation, and more generally every shift-equivariant bijection, the numbers $u(1), \ldots, u(n)$ must all be distinct modulo n. An affine permutation is uniquely determined by its window notation $[u(1), \ldots, u(n)]$, because all other values of $u$ can be found by shifting these values. Thus, affine permutations may also be identified with tuples $[u(1), \ldots, u(n)]$ of integers that contain one element from each congruence class modulo n and sum to $1 + 2 + \cdots + n$.

To translate between the combinatorial and algebraic definitions, for $i = 1, \ldots, n- 1$ one may identify the Coxeter generator $s_i$ with the affine permutation that has window notation $[1, 2, \ldots, i - 1, i + 1, i, i + 2, \ldots, n ]$, and also identify the generator $s_0 = s_n$ with the affine permutation $[0, 2, 3, \ldots, n - 2, n - 1, n + 1]$. More generally, every reflection (that is, a conjugate of one of the Coxeter generators) can be described uniquely as follows: for distinct integers i, j in $\{1, \ldots, n\}$ and arbitrary integer k, it maps i to j − kn, maps j to i + kn, and fixes all inputs not congruent to i or j modulo n.

=== Representation as matrices ===
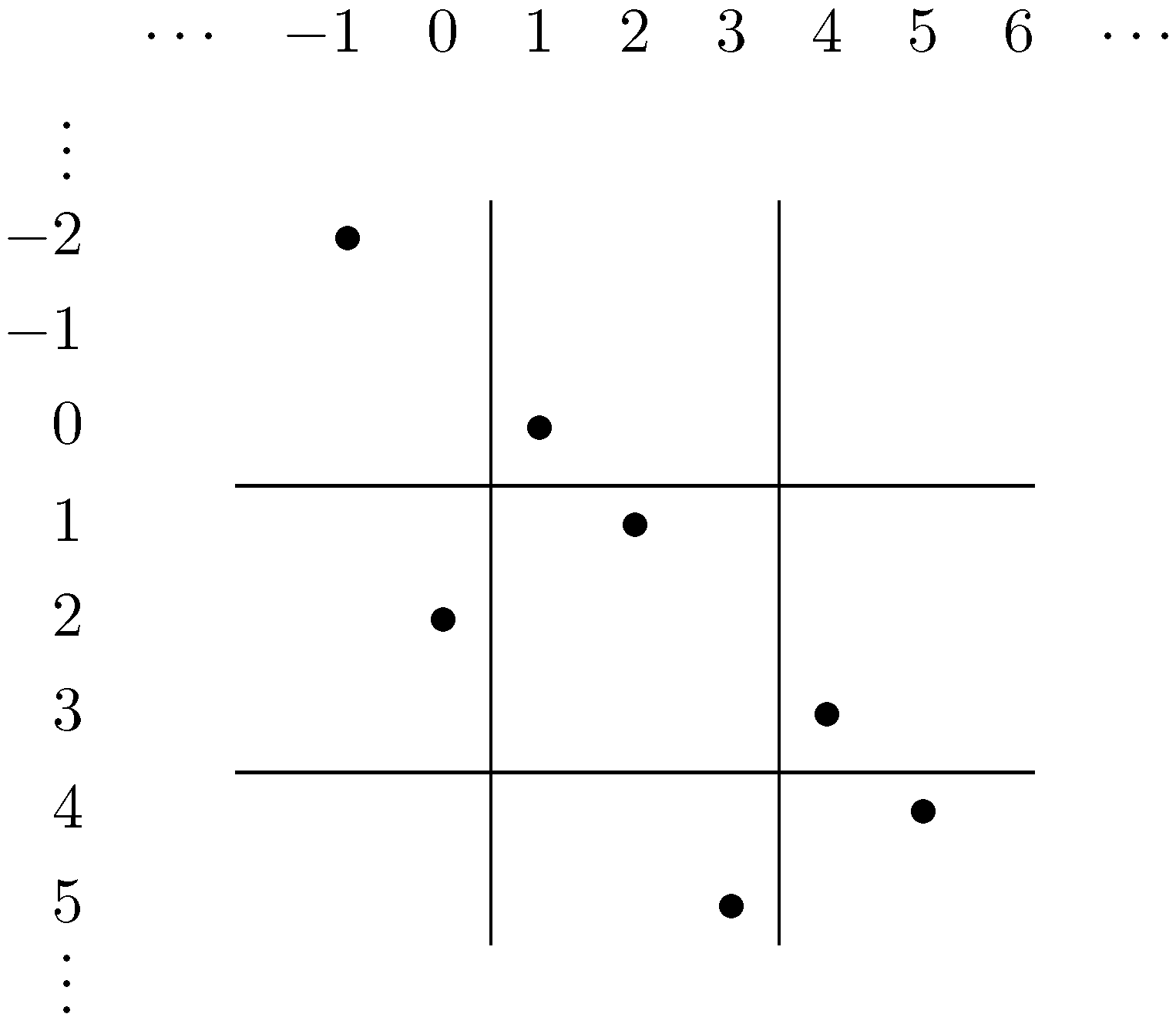
The matrix representation of the affine permutation [2, 0, 4], with the conventions that 1s are replaced by • and 0s are omitted. Row and column labelings are shown.

Affine permutations can be represented as infinite periodic permutation matrices. If $u : \mathbb{Z} \to \mathbb{Z}$ is an affine permutation, the corresponding matrix has entry 1 at position $(i, u(i))$ in the infinite grid $\mathbb{Z} \times \mathbb{Z}$ for each integer i, and all other entries are equal to 0. Since u is a bijection, the resulting matrix contains exactly one 1 in every row and column. The periodicity condition on the map u ensures that the entry at position $(a, b)$ is equal to the entry at position $(a + n, b + n)$ for every pair of integers $(a, b)$. For example, a portion of the matrix for the affine permutation $[2, 0, 4] \in \widetilde{S}_3$ is shown in the figure. In row 1, there is a 1 in column 2; in row 2, there is a 1 in column 0; and in row 3, there is a 1 in column 4. The rest of the entries in those rows and columns are all 0, and all the other entries in the matrix are fixed by the periodicity condition.

== Relationship to the finite symmetric group ==
The affine symmetric group $\widetilde{S}_n$ contains the finite symmetric group $S_n$ of permutations on $n$ elements as both a subgroup and a quotient group. These connections allow a direct translation between the combinatorial and geometric definitions of the affine symmetric group.

=== As a subgroup ===
There is a canonical way to choose a subgroup of $\widetilde{S}_n$ that is isomorphic to the finite symmetric group $S_n$. In terms of the algebraic definition, this is the subgroup of $\widetilde{S}_n$ generated by $s_1, \ldots, s_{n - 1}$ (excluding the simple reflection $s_0 = s_n$). Geometrically, this corresponds to the subgroup of transformations that fix the origin, while combinatorially it corresponds to the window notations for which $\{u(1), \ldots, u(n) \} = \{1, 2, \ldots, n \}$ (that is, in which the window notation is the one-line notation of a finite permutation).

If $u = [u(1), u(2), \ldots, u(n)]$ is the window notation of an element of this standard copy of $S_n \subset \widetilde{S}_n$, its action on the hyperplane V in $\R^n$ is given by permutation of coordinates: $(x_1, x_2, \ldots, x_n) \cdot u = (x_{u(1)}, x_{u(2)}, \ldots, x_{u(n)})$. (In this article, the geometric action of permutations and affine permutations is on the right; thus, if u and v are two affine permutations, the action of uv on a point is given by first applying u, then applying v.)

There are also many nonstandard copies of $S_n$ contained in $\widetilde{S}_n$. A geometric construction is to pick any point a in Λ (that is, an integer vector whose coordinates sum to 0); the subgroup $(\widetilde{S}_n)_a$ of $\widetilde{S}_n$ of isometries that fix a is isomorphic to $S_n$.

=== As a quotient ===
There is a simple map (technically, a surjective group homomorphism) π from $\widetilde{S}_n$ onto the finite symmetric group $S_n$. In terms of the combinatorial definition, an affine permutation can be mapped to a permutation by reducing the window entries modulo n to elements of $\{1, 2, \ldots, n\}$, leaving the one-line notation of a permutation. In this article, the image $\pi(u)$ of an affine permutation u is called the underlying permutation of u.

The map π sends the Coxeter generator $s_0 = [0, 2, 3, 4, \ldots, n - 2, n - 1, n + 1]$ to the permutation whose one-line notation and cycle notation are $[n , 2 , 3 , 4, \ldots , n - 2 , n - 1 , 1]$ and $(1 \; n)$, respectively.

The kernel of π is by definition the set of affine permutations whose underlying permutation is the identity. The window notations of such affine permutations are of the form $[1 - a_1 \cdot n, 2 - a_2 \cdot n, \ldots, n - a_n \cdot n]$, where $(a_1, a_2, \ldots, a_n)$ is an integer vector such that $a_1 + a_2 + \ldots + a_n = 0$, that is, where $(a_1, \ldots, a_n) \in \Lambda$. Geometrically, this kernel consists of the translations, the isometries that shift the entire space V without rotating or reflecting it. In an abuse of notation, the symbol Λ is used in this article for all three of these sets (integer vectors in V, affine permutations with underlying permutation the identity, and translations); in all three settings, the natural group operation turns Λ into an abelian group, generated freely by the n − 1 vectors $\{(1, -1, 0, \ldots, 0), (0, 1, -1, \ldots, 0), \ldots, (0, \ldots, 0, 1, -1)\}$.

=== Connection between the geometric and combinatorial definitions ===
Alcoves for $\widetilde{S}_3$ labeled by affine permutations. An alcove A is labeled by the window notation for a permutation u if u sends the fundamental alcove (shaded) to A. Negative numbers are denoted by overbars.

The affine symmetric group $\widetilde{S}_n$ has Λ as a normal subgroup, and is isomorphic to the semidirect product
$$\widetilde{S}_n \cong S_n \ltimes \Lambda$$
of this subgroup with the finite symmetric group $S_n$, where the action of $S_n$ on Λ is by permutation of coordinates. Consequently, every element u of $\widetilde{S}_n$ has a unique realization as a product $u = r \cdot t$ where $r$ is a permutation in the standard copy of $S_n$ in $\widetilde{S}_n$ and $t$ is a translation in Λ.

This point of view allows for a direct translation between the combinatorial and geometric definitions of $\widetilde{S}_n$: if one writes $[u(1), \ldots, u(n)] = [r_1 - a_1 \cdot n, \ldots, r_n - a_n \cdot n]$ where $r = [r_1, \ldots, r_n] = \pi(u)$ and $(a_1, a_2, \ldots, a_n) \in \Lambda$ then the affine permutation u corresponds to the rigid motion of V defined by
$$(x_1, \ldots, x_n) \cdot u = \left(x_{r(1)} + a_1, \ldots, x_{r(n)} + a_n \right).$$

Furthermore, as with every affine Coxeter group, the affine symmetric group acts transitively and freely on the set of alcoves: for each two alcoves, a unique group element takes one alcove to the other. Hence, making an arbitrary choice of alcove $A_0$ places the group in one-to-one correspondence with the alcoves: the identity element corresponds to $A_0$, and every other group element g corresponds to the alcove $A = A_0 \cdot g$ that is the image of $A_0$ under the action of g.

=== Example: n = 2 ===
The affine symmetric group $\widetilde{S}_2$ acts on the line V in the Euclidean plane. The reflections are through the dashed lines. The vectors of the root lattice Λ are marked.

Algebraically, $\widetilde{S}_2$ is the infinite dihedral group, generated by two generators $s_0, s_1$ subject to the relations $s_0^2 = s_1^2 = 1$. Every other element of the group can be written as an alternating product of copies of $s_0$ and $s_1$.

Combinatorially, the affine permutation $s_1$ has window notation $[2, 1]$, corresponding to the bijection $2k \mapsto 2k - 1, 2k - 1 \mapsto 2k$ for every integer k. The affine permutation $s_0$ has window notation $[0, 3]$, corresponding to the bijection $2k \mapsto 2k + 1, 2k + 1 \mapsto 2k$ for every integer k. Other elements have the following window notations:
$$\begin{align}
\overbrace{s_0 s_1 \cdots s_0 s_1}^{2k \text{ factors}} & = [1 + 2k, 2 - 2k ], \\[5pt]
\overbrace{s_1 s_0 \cdots s_1 s_0}^{2k \text{ factors}} & = [1 - 2k, 2 + 2k ], \\[5pt]
\overbrace{s_0 s_1 \cdots s_0}^{2k + 1 \text{ factors}} & = [2 + 2k, 1 - 2k ], \\[5pt]
\overbrace{s_1 s_0 \cdots s_1}^{2k + 1 \text{ factors}} & = [2 - 2(k + 1), 1 + 2(k + 1) ].
\end{align}$$

Geometrically, the space V on which $\widetilde{S}_2$ acts is a line, with infinitely many equally spaced reflections. It is natural to identify the line V with the real line $\R^1$, $s_0$ with reflection around the point 0, and $s_1$ with reflection around the point 1. In this case, the reflection $(s_0 s_1)^k s_0$ reflects across the point –k for any integer k, the composition $s_0 s_1$ translates the line by –2, and the composition $s_1 s_0$ translates the line by 2.

== Permutation statistics and permutation patterns ==
Many permutation statistics and other features of the combinatorics of finite permutations can be extended to the affine case.

=== Descents, length, and inversions ===
The length $\ell(g)$ of an element g of a Coxeter group G is the smallest number k such that g can be written as a product $g= s_{i_1} \cdots s_{i_k}$ of k Coxeter generators of G. Geometrically, the length of an element g in $\widetilde{S}_n$ is the number of reflecting hyperplanes that separate $A_0$ and $A_0 \cdot g$, where $A_0$ is the fundamental alcove (the simplex bounded by the reflecting hyperplanes of the Coxeter generators $s_0, s_1, \ldots, s_{n - 1}$). (Note: In fact, the same is true for any affine Coxeter group.) Combinatorially, the length of an affine permutation is encoded in terms of an appropriate notion of inversions: for an affine permutation u, the length is
$$\ell(u) = \# \left\{ (i, j) \colon i \in \{1, \ldots, n\}, j \in \mathbb{Z}, i < j, \text{ and } u(i) > u(j) \right\}.$$
Alternatively, it is the number of equivalence classes of pairs $(i, j) \in \mathbb{Z} \times \mathbb{Z}$ such that $i < j$ and $u(i) > u(j)$ under the equivalence relation $(i, j) \equiv (i', j')$ if $(i - i', j - j') = (kn, kn)$ for some integer k. The generating function for length in $\widetilde{S}_n$ is
$$\sum_{g \in \widetilde{S}_n} q^{\ell(g)} = \frac{1 - q^n}{(1 - q)^n}.$$

Similarly, there is an affine analogue of descents in permutations: an affine permutation u has a descent in position i if $u(i) > u(i + 1)$. (By periodicity, u has a descent in position i if and only if it has a descent in position $i + kn$ for all integers k.) Algebraically, the descents corresponds to the right descents in the sense of Coxeter groups; that is, i is a descent of u if and only if $\ell(u \cdot s_i) < \ell (u)$. The left descents (that is, those indices i such that $\ell(s_i \cdot u) < \ell (u)$) are the descents of the inverse affine permutation $u^{-1}$; equivalently, they are the values i such that i occurs before i − 1 in the sequence $\ldots, u(-2), u(-1), u(0), u(1), u(2), \ldots$. Geometrically, i is a descent of u if and only if the fixed hyperplane of $s_i$ separates the alcoves $A_0$ and $A_0 \cdot u.$

Because there are only finitely many possibilities for the number of descents of an affine permutation, but infinitely many affine permutations, it is not possible to naively form a generating function for affine permutations by number of descents (an affine analogue of Eulerian polynomials). One possible resolution is to consider affine descents (equivalently, cyclic descents) in the finite symmetric group $S_n$. Another is to consider simultaneously the length and number of descents of an affine permutation. The multivariate generating function for these statistics over $\widetilde{S}_n$ simultaneously for all n is
$$\sum_{n \geq 1} \frac{x^n}{1 - q^n} \sum_{w \in \widetilde{S}_n} t^{\operatorname{des}(w)} q^{\ell(w)}
=
\left[
\frac{x \cdot \frac{\partial}{\partial{x}} \log(\exp(x; q))}{1 - t \exp(x; q)}
\right]_{x \mapsto x \frac{1 - t}{1 - q}}$$
where des(w) is the number of descents of the affine permutation w and $\exp(x; q)$ is the q-exponential function, defined as
$$\exp(x; q) = \sum_{n \geq 0} \frac{x^n (1 - q)^n}{(1 - q)(1 - q^2) \cdots (1 - q^n)}.$$

=== Cycle type and reflection length ===
Any bijection $u : \mathbb{Z} \to \mathbb{Z}$ partitions the integers into a (possibly infinite) list of (possibly infinite) cycles: for each integer i, the cycle containing i is the sequence $( \ldots, u^{-2}(i), u^{-1}(i), i, u(i), u^2(i), \ldots )$ where exponentiation represents functional composition. For an affine permutation u, the following conditions are equivalent: all cycles of u are finite, u has finite order, and the geometric action of u on the space V has at least one fixed point.

The reflection length $\ell_R(u)$ of an element u of $\widetilde{S}_n$ is the smallest number k such that there exist reflections $r_1, \ldots, r_k$ such that $u = r_1 \cdots r_k$. (In the symmetric group, reflections are transpositions, and the reflection length of a permutation u is $n - c(u)$, where $c(u)$ is the number of cycles of u.) In (Lewis et al. 2019), the following formula was proved for the reflection length of an affine permutation u: for each cycle of u, define the weight to be the integer k such that consecutive entries congruent modulo n differ by exactly kn. Form a tuple of cycle weights of u (counting translates of the same cycle by multiples of n only once), and define the nullity $\nu(u)$ to be the size of the smallest set partition of this tuple so that each part sums to 0. Then the reflection length of u is
$$\ell_R(u) = n - 2 \nu(u) + c(\pi(u)),$$
where $\pi(u)$ is the underlying permutation of u.

For every affine permutation u, there is a choice of subgroup W of $\widetilde{S}_n$ such that $W \cong S_n$, $\widetilde{S}_n = W \ltimes \Lambda$, and for the standard form $u = w \cdot t$ implied by this semidirect product, the reflection lengths are additive, that is, $\ell_R(u) = \ell_R(w) + \ell_R(t)$.

=== Fully commutative elements and pattern avoidance ===
A reduced word for an element g of a Coxeter group is a tuple $(s_{i_1}, \ldots, s_{i_{\ell(g)}})$ of Coxeter generators of minimum possible length such that $g = s_{i_1} \cdots s_{i_{\ell(g)}}$. The element g is called fully commutative if any reduced word can be transformed into any other by sequentially swapping pairs of factors that commute. For example, in the finite symmetric group $S_4$, the element $2143 = (12)(34)$ is fully commutative, since its two reduced words $(s_1, s_3)$ and $(s_3, s_1)$ can be connected by swapping commuting factors, but $4132 = (142)(3)$ is not fully commutative because there is no way to reach the reduced word $(s_3, s_2, s_3, s_1)$ starting from the reduced word $(s_2, s_3, s_2, s_1)$ by commutations.

Billey, Jockusch & Stanley (1993) proved that in the finite symmetric group $S_n$, a permutation is fully commutative if and only if it avoids the permutation pattern 321, that is, if and only if its one-line notation contains no three-term decreasing subsequence. In (Green 2002), this result was extended to affine permutations: an affine permutation u is fully commutative if and only if there do not exist integers $i < j < k$ such that $u(i) > u(j) > u(k)$. (Note: The three positions i, j, and k need not lie in a single window. For example, the affine permutation w in $\widetilde{S}_4$ with window notation $[-4, -1, 1, 14]$ is not fully commutative, because $w(0) = 10$, $w(3) = 1$, and $w(5) = 0$, even though no four consecutive positions contain a decreasing subsequence of length three.)

The number of affine permutations avoiding a single pattern p is finite if and only if p avoids the pattern 321, so in particular there are infinitely many fully commutative affine permutations. These were enumerated by length in (Hanusa & Jones 2010).

== Parabolic subgroups and other structures ==
The parabolic subgroups of $\widetilde{S}_n$ and their coset representatives offer a rich combinatorial structure. Other aspects of affine symmetric groups, such as their Bruhat order and representation theory, may also be understood via combinatorial models.

=== Parabolic subgroups, coset representatives ===
Abacus diagram of the affine permutation [−5, 0, 6, 9]

A standard parabolic subgroup of a Coxeter group is a subgroup generated by a subset of its Coxeter generating set. The maximal parabolic subgroups are those that come from omitting a single Coxeter generator. In $\widetilde{S}_n$, all maximal parabolic subgroups are isomorphic to the finite symmetric group $S_n$. The subgroup generated by the subset $\{s_0, \ldots, s_{n - 1} \} \smallsetminus \{s_i\}$ consists of those affine permutations that stabilize the interval $[i + 1, i + n]$, that is, that map every element of this interval to another element of the interval.

For a fixed element i of $\{0, \ldots, n - 1\}$, let $J = \{s_0, \ldots, s_{n - 1} \} \smallsetminus \{s_i\}$ be the maximal proper subset of Coxeter generators omitting $s_i$, and let $(\widetilde{S}_n)_J$ denote the parabolic subgroup generated by J. Every coset $g \cdot (\widetilde{S}_n)_J$ has a unique element of minimum length. The collection of such representatives, denoted $(\widetilde{S}_n)^J$, consists of the following affine permutations:
$$(\widetilde{S}_n)^J = \left \{ u \in \widetilde{S}_n \colon u(i - n + 1) < u(i - n + 2) < \cdots < u(i - 1) < u(i) \right \}.$$

In the particular case that $J = \{s_1, \ldots, s_{n - 1} \}$, so that $(\widetilde{S}_n)_J \cong S_n$ is the standard copy of $S_n$ inside $\widetilde{S}_n$, the elements of $(\widetilde{S}_n)^J \cong \widetilde{S}_n/S_n$ may naturally be represented by abacus diagrams: the integers are arranged in an infinite strip of width n, increasing sequentially along rows and then from top to bottom; integers are circled if they lie directly above one of the window entries of the minimal coset representative. For example, the minimal coset representative $u = [-5, 0, 6, 9]$ is represented by the abacus diagram at right. To compute the length of the representative from the abacus diagram, one adds up the number of uncircled numbers that are smaller than the last circled entry in each column. (In the example shown, this gives $5 + 3 + 0 + 1 = 9$.)

Other combinatorial models of minimum-length coset representatives for $\widetilde{S}_n/S_n$ can be given in terms of core partitions (integer partitions in which no hook length is divisible by n) or bounded partitions (integer partitions in which no part is larger than n − 1). Under these correspondences, it can be shown that the weak Bruhat order on $\widetilde{S}_n / S_n$ is isomorphic to a certain subposet of Young's lattice.

=== Bruhat order ===
The Bruhat order on $\widetilde{S}_n$ has the following combinatorial realization. If u is an affine permutation and i and j are integers, define $u [i, j]$ to be the number of integers a such that $a \leq i$ and $u(a) \geq j$. (For example, with $u = [2, 0, 4] \in \widetilde{S}_3$, one has $u [ 3, 1 ] = 3$: the three relevant values are $a = 0, 1, 3$, which are respectively mapped by u to 1, 2, and 4.) Then for two affine permutations u, v, one has that $u \leq v$ in Bruhat order if and only if $u[i, j] \leq v[i, j]$ for all integers i, j.

=== Representation theory and an affine Robinson–Schensted correspondence ===
In the finite symmetric group, the Robinson–Schensted correspondence gives a bijection between the group and pairs $(P, Q)$ of standard Young tableaux of the same shape. This bijection plays a central role in the combinatorics and the representation theory of the symmetric group. For example, in the language of Kazhdan–Lusztig theory, two permutations lie in the same left cell if and only if their images under Robinson–Schensted have the same tableau Q, and in the same right cell if and only if their images have the same tableau P. In (Shi 1986), Jian-Yi Shi showed that left cells for $\widetilde{S}_n$ are indexed instead by tabloids, (Note: A tabloid is a filling of the Young diagram with distinct entries, where two fillings are equivalent if they differ in the order of elements in rows. They are equinumerous with row-strict tableaux, in which entries are required to increase along rows (whereas standard Young tableau have entries that increase along rows and down columns).) and in (Shi 1991) he gave an algorithm to compute the tabloid analogous to the tableau P for an affine permutation. In (Chmutov, Pylyavskyy & Yudovina 2018), the authors extended Shi's work to give a bijective map between $\widetilde{S}_n$ and triples $(P, Q, \rho)$ consisting of two tabloids of the same shape and an integer vector whose entries satisfy certain inequalities. Their procedure uses the matrix representation of affine permutations and generalizes the shadow construction, introduced in (Viennot 1977).

== Inverse realizations ==
Alcoves for $\widetilde{S}_3$ labeled by affine permutations, inverse to the labeling above

In some situations, one may wish to consider the action of the affine symmetric group on $\Z$ or on alcoves that is inverse to the one given above. (Note: In other words, one might be interested in switching from a left group action to a right action or vice versa.) These alternate realizations are described below.

In the combinatorial action of $\widetilde{S}_n$ on $\Z$, the generator $s_i$ acts by switching the values i and i + 1. In the inverse action, it instead switches the entries in positions i and i + 1. Similarly, the action of a general reflection will be to switch the entries at positions j − kn and i + kn for each k, fixing all inputs at positions not congruent to i or j modulo n. (Note: In the finite symmetric group $S_n$, the analogous distinction is between the active and passive forms of a permutation.)

In the geometric action of $\widetilde{S}_n$, the generator $s_i$ acts on an alcove A by reflecting it across one of the bounding planes of the fundamental alcove A_{0}. In the inverse action, it instead reflects A across one of its own bounding planes. From this perspective, a reduced word corresponds to an alcove walk on the tessellated space V.

== Relationship to other mathematical objects ==
The affine symmetric groups are closely related to a variety of other mathematical objects.

=== Juggling patterns ===
The juggling pattern 441 visualized as an arc diagram: the height of each throw corresponds to the length of an arc; the two colors of nodes are the left and right hands of the juggler. This pattern has four crossings, which repeat periodically.

The juggling pattern 441

In (Ehrenborg & Readdy 1996), a correspondence is given between affine permutations and juggling patterns encoded in a version of siteswap notation. Here, a juggling pattern of period n is a sequence $(a_1, \ldots, a_n)$ of nonnegative integers (with certain restrictions) that captures the behavior of balls thrown by a juggler, where the number $a_i$ indicates the length of time the ith throw spends in the air (equivalently, the height of the throw). (Note: Not every sequence of n nonnegative integers is a juggling sequence. In particular, a sequence corresponds to a "simple juggling pattern", with one ball caught and thrown at a time, if and only if the function $i \mapsto i + a_i \mod{n}$ is a permutation of $\{1, \ldots, n\}$.) The number b of balls in the pattern is the average $b = \frac{a_1 + \cdots + a_n}{n}$. The Ehrenborg–Readdy correspondence associates to each juggling pattern ${\bf a} = (a_1, \ldots, a_n)$ of period n the function $w_{\bf a} \colon \Z \to \Z$ defined by
$$w_{\bf a}(i) = i + a_i - b,$$
where indices of the sequence a are taken modulo n. Then $w_{\bf a}$ is an affine permutation in $\widetilde{S}_n$, and moreover every affine permutation arises from a juggling pattern in this way. Under this bijection, the length of the affine permutation is encoded by a natural statistic in the juggling pattern:
$$\ell(w_{\bf a}) = (b - 1)n - \operatorname{cross}({\bf a}),$$
where $\operatorname{cross}({\bf a})$ is the number of crossings (up to periodicity) in the arc diagram of a. This allows an elementary proof of the generating function for affine permutations by length.

For example, the juggling pattern 441 has $n = 3$ and $b = \frac{4 + 4 + 1}{3} = 3$. Therefore, it corresponds to the affine permutation $w_{441} = [1 + 4 - 3, 2 + 4 - 3, 3 + 1 - 3] = [2, 3, 1]$. The juggling pattern has four crossings, and the affine permutation has length $\ell(w_{441}) = (3 - 1) \cdot 3 - 4 = 2$.

Similar techniques can be used to derive the generating function for minimal coset representatives of $\widetilde{S}_n/S_n$ by length.

=== Complex reflection groups ===
In a finite-dimensional real inner product space, a reflection is a linear transformation that fixes a linear hyperplane pointwise and negates the vector orthogonal to the plane. This notion may be extended to vector spaces over other fields. In particular, in a complex inner product space, a reflection is a unitary transformation T of finite order that fixes a hyperplane. (Note: In some sources, unitary reflections are called pseudoreflections.) This implies that the vectors orthogonal to the hyperplane are eigenvectors of T, and the associated eigenvalue is a complex root of unity. A complex reflection group is a finite group of linear transformations on a complex vector space generated by reflections.

The complex reflection groups were fully classified by Shephard & Todd (1954): each complex reflection group is isomorphic to a product of irreducible complex reflection groups, and every irreducible either belongs to an infinite family $G(m, p, n)$ (where m, p, and n are positive integers such that p divides m) or is one of 34 other (so-called "exceptional") examples. The group $G(m, 1, n)$ is the generalized symmetric group: algebraically, it is the wreath product $(\Z / m \Z) \wr S_n$ of the cyclic group $\Z / m \Z$ with the symmetric group $S_n$. Concretely, the elements of the group may be represented by monomial matrices (matrices having one nonzero entry in every row and column) whose nonzero entries are all mth roots of unity. The groups $G(m, p, n)$ are subgroups of $G(m, 1, n)$, and in particular the group $G(m, m, n)$ consists of those matrices in which the product of the nonzero entries is equal to 1.

In (Shi 2002), Shi showed that the affine symmetric group is a generic cover of the family $\left\{G(m, m, n) \colon m \geq 1 \right\}$, in the following sense: for every positive integer m, there is a surjection $\pi_m$ from $\widetilde{S}_n$ to $G(m, m, n)$, and these maps are compatible with the natural surjections $G(m, m, n) \twoheadrightarrow G(p, p, n)$ when $p \mid m$ that come from raising each entry to the m/pth power. Moreover, these projections respect the reflection group structure, in that the image of every reflection in $\widetilde{S}_n$ under $\pi_m$ is a reflection in $G(m, m, n)$; and similarly when $m > 1$ the image of the standard Coxeter element $s_0 \cdot s_1 \cdots s_{n - 1}$ in $\widetilde{S}_n$ is a Coxeter element in $G(m, m, n)$.

=== Affine Lie algebras ===
Each affine Coxeter group is associated to an affine Lie algebra, a certain infinite-dimensional non-associative algebra with unusually nice representation-theoretic properties. (Note: For example, like finite-dimensional semisimple Lie algebras, they admit an explicit parameterization of their integrable highest weight modules; whereas there is no corresponding general theory for general infinite-dimensional Lie algebras.) In this association, the Coxeter group arises as a group of symmetries of the root space of the Lie algebra (the dual of the Cartan subalgebra). In the classification of affine Lie algebras, the one associated to $\widetilde{S}_n$ is of (untwisted) type $A_{n - 1}^{(1)}$, with Cartan matrix $\left[ \begin{array}{rr} 2 & - 2 \\ - 2& 2 \end{array} \right]$ for $n = 2$ and
$$\left[ \begin{array}{rrrrrr} 2 & -1 & 0 & \cdots & 0 & -1 \\
-1 & 2 & -1 & \cdots & 0 & 0 \\
0 & -1 & 2 & \cdots & 0 & 0 \\
\vdots & \vdots & \vdots & \ddots & \vdots & \vdots \\
0 & 0 & 0 & \cdots & 2 & -1 \\
-1 & 0 & 0 & \cdots & -1 & 2
\end{array} \right]$$
(a circulant matrix) for $n > 2$.

Like other Kac–Moody algebras, affine Lie algebras satisfy the Weyl–Kac character formula, which expresses the characters of the algebra in terms of their highest weights. In the case of affine Lie algebras, the resulting identities are equivalent to the Macdonald identities. In particular, for the affine Lie algebra of type $A_1^{(1)}$, associated to the affine symmetric group $\widetilde{S}_2$, the corresponding Macdonald identity is equivalent to the Jacobi triple product.

=== Braid group and group-theoretic properties ===
Coxeter groups have a number of special properties not shared by all groups. These include that their word problem is decidable (that is, there exists an algorithm that can determine whether or not any given product of the generators is equal to the identity element) and that they are linear groups (that is, they can be represented by a group of invertible matrices over a field).

Each Coxeter group W is associated to an Artin–Tits group $B_W$, which is defined by a similar presentation that omits relations of the form $s^2 = 1$ for each generator s. In particular, the Artin–Tits group associated to $\widetilde{S}_n$ is generated by n elements $\sigma_0, \sigma_1, \ldots, \sigma_{n - 1}$ subject to the relations $\sigma_i \sigma_{i + 1} \sigma_i = \sigma_{i + 1}\sigma_i \sigma_{i + 1}$ for $i = 0, \ldots, n - 1$ (and no others), where as before the indices are taken modulo n (so $\sigma_n = \sigma_0$). Artin–Tits groups of Coxeter groups are conjectured to have many nice properties: for example, they are conjectured to be torsion-free, to have trivial center, to have solvable word problem, and to satisfy the $K(\pi, 1)$ conjecture. These conjectures are not known to hold for all Artin–Tits groups, but in (Charney & Peifer 2003) it was shown that $B_{\widetilde{S}_n}$ has these properties. (Subsequently, they have been proved for the Artin–Tits groups associated to affine Coxeter groups.) In the case of the affine symmetric group, these proofs make use of an associated Garside structure on the Artin–Tits group.

Generators of the Artin–Tits group associated with the affine symmetric group, represented as braids with one fixed strand (for n = 4) and as braids drawn on a cylinder (for n = 3)

Artin–Tits groups are sometimes also known as generalized braid groups, because the Artin–Tits group $B_{S_n}$ of the (finite) symmetric group is the braid group on n strands. Not all Artin–Tits groups have a natural representation in terms of geometric braids. However, the Artin–Tits group of the hyperoctahedral group $S^{\pm}_n$ (geometrically, the symmetry group of the n-dimensional hypercube; combinatorially, the group of signed permutations of size n) does have such a representation: it is given by the subgroup of the braid group on $n + 1$ strands consisting of those braids for which a particular strand ends in the same position it started in, or equivalently as the braid group of n strands in an annular region. Moreover, the Artin–Tits group of the hyperoctahedral group $S^{\pm}_n$ can be written as a semidirect product of $B_{\widetilde{S}_n}$ with an infinite cyclic group. It follows that $B_{\widetilde{S}_n}$ may be interpreted as a certain subgroup consisting of geometric braids, and also that it is a linear group.

=== Extended affine symmetric group ===
The affine symmetric group is a subgroup of the extended affine symmetric group. The extended group is isomorphic to the wreath product $\Z \wr S_n$. Its elements are extended affine permutations: bijections $u \colon \Z \to \Z$ such that $u(x + n) = u(x) + n$ for all integers x. Unlike the affine symmetric group, the extended affine symmetric group is not a Coxeter group. But it has a natural generating set that extends the Coxeter generating set for $\widetilde{S}_n$: the shift operator $\tau$ whose window notation is $\tau = [2, 3, \ldots, n, n + 1]$ generates the extended group with the simple reflections, subject to the additional relations $\tau s_i \tau^{-1} = s_{i + 1}$.

=== Combinatorics of other affine Coxeter groups ===
The geometric action of the affine symmetric group $\widetilde{S}_n$ places it naturally in the family of affine Coxeter groups, each of which has a similar geometric action on a Euclidean space. The combinatorial description of $\widetilde{S}_n$ may also be extended to many of these groups: in Eriksson & Eriksson (1998), an axiomatic description is given of certain permutation groups acting on $\Z$ (the "George groups", in honor of George Lusztig), and it is shown that they are exactly the "classical" Coxeter groups of finite and affine types A, B, C, and D. (In the classification of affine Coxeter groups, the affine symmetric group is type A.) Thus, the combinatorial interpretations of descents, inversions, etc., carry over in these cases. Abacus models of minimum-length coset representatives for parabolic quotients have also been extended to this context.

== History ==
The study of Coxeter groups in general could be said to first arise in the classification of regular polyhedra (the Platonic solids) in ancient Greece. The modern systematic study (connecting the algebraic and geometric definitions of finite and affine Coxeter groups) began in work of Coxeter in the 1930s. The combinatorial description of the affine symmetric group first appears in work of Lusztig (1983), and was expanded upon by Shi (1986); both authors used the combinatorial description to study the Kazhdan–Lusztig cells of $\widetilde{S}_n$. The proof that the combinatorial definition agrees with the algebraic definition was given by Eriksson & Eriksson (1998).

== Works cited ==
- Allcock, Daniel (2002), "Braid pictures for Artin groups", Trans. Amer. Math. Soc., 354 (9): 3455–3474, doi:10.1090/S0002-9947-02-02944-6
- Beazley, Elizabeth; Nichols, Margaret; Park, Min Hae; Shi, XiaoLin; Youcis, Alexander (2015), "Bijective projections on parabolic quotients of affine Weyl groups", J. Algebr. Comb., 41 (4): 911–948, arXiv:1212.0771, doi:10.1007/s10801-014-0559-9
- Berg, Chris; Jones, Brant; Vazirani, Monica (2009), "A bijection on core partitions and a parabolic quotient of the affine symmetric group", J. Combin. Theory Ser. A, 116 (8): 1344–1360, arXiv:0804.1380, doi:10.1016/j.jcta.2009.03.013
- Billey, Sara C.; Jockusch, William; Stanley, Richard P. (1993), "Some Combinatorial Properties of Schubert Polynomials", J. Algebr. Comb., 2 (4): 345–374, doi:10.1023/A:1022419800503, hdl:2027.42/46173
- Björner, Anders; Brenti, Francesco (1996), "Affine permutations of type A", Electron. J. Combin., 3 (2) R18, doi:10.37236/1276
- Björner, Anders; Brenti, Francesco (2005), Combinatorics of Coxeter groups, Springer, doi:10.1007/3-540-27596-7, ISBN 978-3540-442387
- Cameron, Peter J. (1994), Combinatorics: Topics, Techniques, Algorithms, Cambridge University Press, doi:10.1017/CBO9780511803888, ISBN 978-0-521-45761-3
- Charney, Ruth; Peifer, David (2003), "The $K(\pi,1)$-conjecture for the affine braid groups", Comment. Math. Helv., 78 (3): 584–600, doi:10.1007/S00014-003-0764-Y
- Chmutov, Michael; Lewis, Joel Brewster; Pylyavskyy, Pavlo (2022), "An affine generalization of evacuation", Selecta Math., New Series, 28 (4) Paper 67, arXiv:1706.00471, doi:10.1007/s00029-022-00779-x
- Chmutov, Michael; Frieden, Gabriel; Kim, Dongkwan; Lewis, Joel Brewster; Yudovina, Elena (2022), "Monodromy in Kazhdan-Lusztig cells in affine type A", Math. Annalen, 386 (3–4): 1891–1949, arXiv:1806.07429, doi:10.1007/s00208-022-02434-4
- Chmutov, Michael; Pylyavskyy, Pavlo; Yudovina, Elena (2018), "Matrix-ball construction of affine Robinson-Schensted correspondence", Selecta Math., New Series, 24 (2): 667–750, arXiv:1511.05861, doi:10.1007/s00029-018-0402-6
- Clark, Eric; Ehrenborg, Richard (2011), "Excedances of affine permutations", Advances in Applied Mathematics, 46 (1–4): 175–191, doi:10.1016/j.aam.2009.12.006
- Coxeter, H.S.M. (1973), Regular Polytopes (3 ed.), Dover, ISBN 0-486-61480-8
- Crites, Andrew (2010), "Enumerating pattern avoidance for affine permutations", Electron. J. Combin., 17 (1) R127, arXiv:1002.1933, doi:10.37236/399
- Ehrenborg, Richard; Readdy, Margaret (1996), "Juggling and applications to q-analogues" (PDF), Discrete Math., 157 (1–3): 107–125, doi:10.1016/S0012-365X(96)83010-X
- Eriksson, Henrik; Eriksson, Kimmo (1998), "Affine Weyl groups as infinite permutations", Electron. J. Combin., 5 R18, doi:10.37236/1356
- Gallian, Joseph A. (2013), Contemporary Abstract Algebra (8th ed.), Brooks/Cole, ISBN 978-1-133-59970-8, LCCN 2012938179
- Green, R.M. (2002), "On 321-Avoiding Permutations in Affine Weyl Groups", J. Algebr. Comb., 15 (3): 241–252, doi:10.1023/A:1015012524524
- Hanusa, Christopher R.H.; Jones, Brant C. (2010), "The enumeration of fully commutative affine permutations", Eur. J. Comb., 31 (5): 1342–1359, arXiv:0907.0709, doi:10.1016/j.ejc.2009.11.010
- Hanusa, Christopher R.H.; Jones, Brant C. (2012), "Abacus models for parabolic quotients of affine Weyl groups", J. Algebra, 361: 134–162, arXiv:1105.5333v2, doi:10.1016/j.jalgebra.2012.03.029
- Humphreys, James E. (1990), Reflection groups and Coxeter groups, Cambridge University Press, doi:10.1017/CBO9780511623646, ISBN 0-521-37510-X
- Kac, Victor G. (1990), Infinite-dimensional Lie algebras (3rd ed.), Cambridge University Press, doi:10.1017/CBO9780511626234, ISBN 0-521-46693-8
- Kane, Richard (2001), Reflection groups and invariant theory, CMS Books in Mathematics/Ouvrages de Mathématiques de la SMC, Springer-Verlag, doi:10.1007/978-1-4757-3542-0, ISBN 0-387-98979-X
- Kent, IV, Richard P.; Peifer, David (2002), "A geometric and algebraic description of annular braid groups", International Conference on Geometric and Combinatorial Methods in Group Theory and Semigroup Theory (Lincoln, NE, 2000), Internat. J. Algebra Comput., 12 (1–2): 85–97, doi:10.1142/S0218196702000997
- Knutson, Allen; Lam, Thomas; Speyer, David E. (2013), "Positroid varieties: juggling and geometry", Compositio Mathematica, 149 (10): 1710–1752, arXiv:0903.3694, doi:10.1112/S0010437X13007240
- Lam, Thomas (2015), "The shape of a random affine Weyl group element and random core partitions", Ann. Probab., 43 (4): 1643–1662, arXiv:1102.4405v3, doi:10.1214/14-AOP915
- Lapointe, Luc; Morse, Jennifer (2005), "Tableaux on $k+1$-cores, reduced words for affine permutations, and $k$-Schur expansions", J. Combin. Theory Ser. A, 112 (1): 44–81, doi:10.1016/j.jcta.2005.01.003
- Lehrer, Gustav I.; Taylor, Donald E. (2009), Unitary reflection groups, Australian Mathematical Society Lecture Series, vol. 20, Cambridge University Press, ISBN 978-0-521-74989-3, MR 2542964
- Lewis, Joel Brewster (2020), "A note on the Hurwitz action on reflection factorizations of Coxeter elements in complex reflection groups", Electron. J. Combin., 27 (2) P2.54, arXiv:2001.08238, doi:10.37236/9351
- Lewis, Joel Brewster; McCammond, Jon; Petersen, T. Kyle; Schwer, Petra (2019), "Computing reflection length in an affine Coxeter group", Trans. Amer. Math. Soc., 371 (6): 4097–4127, arXiv:1710.06920, doi:10.1090/tran/7472
- Lewis, Joel Brewster; Reiner, Victor (2016), "Circuits and Hurwitz action in finite root systems", The New York Journal of Mathematics, 22: 1457–1486, arXiv:1603.05969, MR 3603073
- Lusztig, George (1983), "Some examples of square integrable representations of semisimple p-adic groups", Trans. Amer. Math. Soc., 277: 623–653, doi:10.1090/S0002-9947-1983-0694380-4
- McCammond, Jon (2017), "The mysterious geometry of Artin groups", Winter Braids Lecture Notes, 4 (Winter Braids VII (Caen, 2017)): Exp. No. 1, 30, doi:10.5802/wbln.17
- McCammond, Jon; Sulway, Robert (2017), "Artin groups of Euclidean type", Invent. Math., 210 (1): 231–282, arXiv:1312.7770, doi:10.1007/s00222-017-0728-2
- Paolini, Giovanni; Salvetti, Mario (2021), "Proof of the $K(\pi,1)$ conjecture for affine Artin groups", Invent. Math., 224 (2): 487–572, arXiv:1907.11795, doi:10.1007/s00222-020-01016-y
- Petersen, T. Kyle (2015), Eulerian Numbers, Birkhäuser Advanced Texts Basler Lehrbücher, Birkhauser, doi:10.1007/978-1-4939-3091-3, ISBN 978-1-4939-3090-6
- Polster, Burkard (2003), The Mathematics of Juggling, Springer, doi:10.1007/b98883, ISBN 0-387-95513-5
- Reiner, Victor (1995), "The distribution of descents and length in a Coxeter group", Electron. J. Combin., 2 R25, doi:10.37236/1219
- Shephard, G. C.; Todd, J. A. (1954), "Finite unitary reflection groups", Canad. J. Math., 6: 274–304, doi:10.4153/CJM-1954-028-3
- Shi, Jian-Yi (1986), The Kazhdan-Lusztig Cells in Certain Affine Weyl Groups, Lecture Notes in Mathematics, vol. 1179, Springer, doi:10.1007/bfb0074968, ISBN 3-540-16439-1
- Shi, Jian Yi (1987), "Alcoves corresponding to an affine Weyl group", J. London Math. Soc., 2, 35 (1): 42–55, doi:10.1112/jlms/s2-35.1.42
- Shi, Jian-Yi (1991), "The generalized Robinson–Schensted algorithm on the affine Weyl group of type A_{n−1}", J. Algebra, 139 (2): 364–394, doi:10.1016/0021-8693(91)90300-W
- Shi, Jian-Yi (2002), "Certain imprimitive reflection groups and their generic versions", Trans. Amer. Math. Soc., 354 (5): 2115–2129, doi:10.1090/S0002-9947-02-02941-0
- Stembridge, John (1996), "On the Fully Commutative Elements of Coxeter Groups", J. Algebr. Comb., 5 (4): 353–385, doi:10.1007/BF00193185, hdl:2027.42/46260
- Viennot, G. (1977), "Une forme géométrique de la correspondance de Robinson-Schensted", in Foata, Dominique (ed.), Combinatoire et Représentation du Groupe Symétrique, Lecture Notes in Mathematics (in French), vol. 579, Springer, pp. 29–58, doi:10.1007/BFb0090011, ISBN 978-3-540-08143-2
