= Horadam =

Horadam is a surname. Notable people with this name include:

- David Horadam (1883–1915), Australian rugby player
- Eleanor Mollie Horadam (1921–2002), English-Australian mathematician, mother of Kathy
- Ernst Horadam (1883–1956), leader of the Freikorps Oberland and later German Nazi officer
- Kathy Horadam (born 1951), Australian mathematician, daughter of Eleanor Mollie
