= Greta Panova =

Bulgarian-American mathematician

Greta Cvetanova Panova
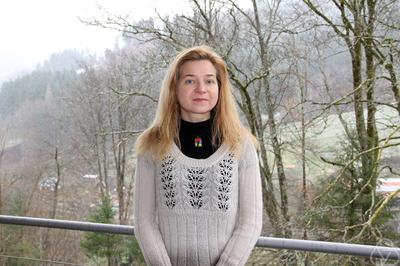
- Panova at Oberwolfach in 2020
- Born: 1983
- Scientific career
- Fields: Mathematics
- Doctoral advisor: Richard P. Stanley

Greta Cvetanova Panova (Bulgarian: Грета Цветанова Панова, born 1983 in Sofia, Bulgaria) is a Bulgarian-American mathematician. She is a professor of mathematics and Gabilan Distinguished Professor in Science and Engineering at the University of Southern California in Los Angeles. Her research interests include combinatorics, probability and theoretical computer science.

== Education and career ==
Panova received her B.S. in 2005 from MIT. She received M.A. in 2006 from University of California, Berkeley and Ph.D. in mathematics from Harvard University in 2011, under the supervision of Richard P. Stanley. She was then a postdoc at UCLA (2011–2014), Assistant and Associate Professor at the University of Pennsylvania (2014–2018), and is currently a tenured Professor at the University of Southern California. In 2023, she was named Gabilan Distinguished Professor.

Panova research is in algebraic combinatorics with applications to geometric complexity theory, probability and statistical mechanics. As of 2024, she is a co-Editor-in-Chief of the Electronic Journal of Combinatorics, and a member of the editorial board of Algebraic Combinatorics and the Arnold Mathematical Journal.

== Selected awards ==
Panova was a three time medalist at the International Mathematical Olympiad (1999–2001, one gold and two silver medals) and a third prize winner at the William Lowell Putnam Mathematical Competition (2001). She is a recipient of Katz Fellowship (UC Berkeley), Putnam Fellowship (Harvard), James Mills Peirce Fellowship (Harvard), Simons Postdoctoral Fellowship (UCLA), and von Neumann Fellowship (IAS). Panova was an invited plenary speaker at the 2017 International Conference on Formal Power Series and Algebraic Combinatorics and at the 2023 Current Developments in Mathematics Conference. Panova is the 2020 recipient of the IMI Award, awarded once every three years by the Institute of Mathematics and Informatics at the Bulgarian Academy of Science to a Bulgarian citizen under the age of 40 for high achievements in the field of mathematics, and the 2024–5 Birman Fellow of the American Mathematics Society.
