= Catherine Greenhill =

Australian mathematician

Catherine Greenhill FAA FRSN
- Born: Catherine Greenhill
- Citizenship: Australian
- Education: University of Queensland (B.Sc. (Hons) and M.Sc); University of Oxford (PhD)
- Scientific career
- Fields: Combinatorics
- Workplaces: University of New South Wales
- Thesis: From Multisets to Matrix Groups: Some Algorithms Related to the Exterior Square (1996)
- Doctoral advisor: Peter M. Neumann
- Website: www.unsw.edu.au/staff/catherine-greenhill

Catherine Greenhill FAA FRSN is an Australian pure mathematician known for her research on random graphs, combinatorial enumeration and Markov chains. She is a professor of mathematics in the School of Mathematics and Statistics at the University of New South Wales.

== Education ==
Greenhill was born in Queensland, Australia. She attended St Margaret's Anglican Girls' School, where she developed an interest in mathematics and science. She then completed a Bachelor of Science (Hons) at the University of Queensland in 1991, followed by a Master of Science by research in 1992, supervised by Anne Penfold Street. She earned her Ph.D. in 1996 at the University of Oxford, under the supervision of Peter M. Neumann. Her dissertation was From Multisets to Matrix Groups: Some Algorithms Related to the Exterior Square.

== Career ==
After completing her PhD, she obtained a postdoctoral position at the University of Leeds where she worked on the analysis of combinatorial Markov chains and its computational complexity. She then moved back to Australia where she took up an Australian Research Council postdoctoral fellowship at the University of Melbourne, working with Nick Wormald on the study of random regular graphs.

In 2003, she joined the University of New South Wales (UNSW) and was promoted to Associate Professor in 2014, the first female mathematician to earn such a promotion at UNSW. In 2019, she was one of the first three female mathematicians to be promoted to Professor at UNSW. In 2023, she was appointed Head of the Pure Mathematics Department at UNSW. She is currently the head of the Combinatorics group in the School of Mathematics at UNSW. Her main research interests lie in asymptotic, probabilistic and algorithmic combinatorics.

She is a former editor-in-chief of the Electronic Journal of Combinatorics, a member of the editorial board for Random Structures & Algorithms and the Australasian Journal of Combinatorics, and a member of the editorial advisory board for Special Matrices. She has held positions on the Women in Mathematics Special Interest Group of the Australian Mathematical Society, the Council of the Combinatorial Mathematics Society of Australasia, the Committee for Women in Mathematics and the Equity, Diversity and Inclusion Committee of the School of Mathematics and Statistics at UNSW. In 2025, she became the Mathematical Advisory Committee Chair for the Simon Marais Mathematics Competition

== Awards and honours ==
- In 2010, she received the Hall Medal of the Institute of Combinatorics and its Applications.
- In 2013, she was awarded the UNSW Faculty of Science June Griffith Fellowship for Academic Women in Leadership.
- In 2015, she received the Christopher Heyde Medal from the Australian Academy of Science for distinguished research in the mathematical sciences.
- In 2022, she was elected a Fellow of the Australian Academy of Science.
- In 2023, she was elected a Fellow of the Royal Society of New South Wales.
