= James Haglund =

American mathematician

James Haglund is an American mathematician who specializes in algebraic combinatorics and enumerative combinatorics, and works as a professor of mathematics at the University of Pennsylvania.

== Education ==
Haglund received his Ph.D. in 1993 from the University of Georgia, with the dissertation Compositions, Rook Placements, and Permutations of Vectors supervised by Earl Rodney Canfield.

== Research contributions ==
In 2005, together with M. Haiman and N. Loehr gave the first proof of a combinatorial interpretation of the Macdonald polynomials. In 2007, Haglund, Haiman and Loehr gave a combinatorial formula for the non-symmetric Macdonald polynomials.

Haglund is the author of The $q,t$-Catalan Numbers and the Space of Diagonal Harmonics: With an Appendix on the Combinatorics of Macdonald Polynomials.

== Academic talks ==
In 2024, Haglund gave a talk at KAIST on Superization of Symmetric Functions.

In 2015, together with Alexandre Kirillov and Ching-Li Chai, Haglund gave a talk at Penn Wharton China Center on Penn Math Day, sponsored by the University of Pennsylvania and Peking University.

In 2006, he gave a Plenary Address at the 18th International Conference on Formal Power Series and Algebraic Combinatorics (FPSAC '06), San Diego (USA).

== Editorial ==
Haglund was on the editorial boards of Transactions of the AMS, Journal of Combinatorics, and a few other academic journals.

== Students ==
Among the Ph.D. students supervised by Haglund are Frederick M. Butler, Mahir Bilen Can, Logan Crew, Sarah Katherine Mason, Anna Pun, Chunwei Song, and Meesue Yoo.

== Recognition ==
In 2013, Haglund became an inaugural Fellow of the American Mathematical Society.
