= Beauchard =

Beauchard is a surname. Notable people with the surname include:

- David Beauchard (born 1959), French comic book artist and writer
- Dominique Beauchard, character in American Empire (film)
- Karine Beauchard (born 1978), French mathematician
