= Godsil =

Godsil is a surname, locational for a person from Gad's Hill. Notable people with the surname include:

- Chris Godsil, Canadian mathematician
