= Chris Godsil =

Chris D. Godsil
- Education: University of Melbourne
- Known for: Algebraic combinatorics
- Scientific career
- Fields: Mathematics
- Workplaces: University of Waterloo
- Doctoral advisor: Derek Alan Holton

Christopher David Godsil is a professor and the former Chair at the Department of Combinatorics and Optimization in the faculty of mathematics at the University of Waterloo. He wrote the popular textbook on algebraic graph theory, entitled Algebraic Graph Theory, with Gordon Royle, His earlier textbook on algebraic combinatorics discussed distance-regular graphs and association schemes.

== Background ==
He started the Journal of Algebraic Combinatorics, and was an Editor-in-Chief of the Electronic Journal of Combinatorics from 2004 to 2008. He is also on the editorial board of the Journal of Combinatorial Theory Series B and Combinatorica.

He obtained his Ph.D. in 1979 at the University of Melbourne under the supervision of Derek Alan Holton. He wrote a paper with Paul Erdős, so making his Erdős number equal to 1.
