= Electronic Journal of Combinatorics =

The Electronic Journal of Combinatorics
- Discipline: Discrete mathematics
- Language: English

Publication details
- Open access: Free to authors and readers

Standard abbreviations
- ISO 4: Electron. J. Comb.
- MathSciNet: Electron. J. Combin.

Indexing
- ISSN: 1077-8926
- OCLC no.: 38032205

Links
- E-JC homepage

The Electronic Journal of Combinatorics is a peer-reviewed open access scientific journal covering research in combinatorial mathematics. The journal was established in 1994 by Herbert Wilf (University of Pennsylvania) and Neil Calkin (Georgia Institute of Technology). The Electronic Journal of Combinatorics is a founding member of the Free Journal Network. According to the Journal Citation Reports, the journal had a 2017 impact factor of 0.762.

== Editors-in-chief ==
=== Current ===
The current editors-in-chief at Electronic Journal of Combinatorics are:

- Maria Axenovich, Karlsruhe Institute of Technology, Germany
- Anton Bernshteyn, University of California, Los Angeles, United States
- Thomas Bloom, University of Manchester, United Kingdom
- Miklós Bóna, University of Florida, United States
- Daniel Cranston, College of William & Mary, United States
- Michael Drmota, Vienna University of Technology, Austria
- Zdeněk Dvořák, Charles University, Czech Republic
- Jesús A. De Loera, University of California, Davis, United States
- Nikolaos Fountoulakis, University of Birmingham, United Kingdom
- Eric Fusy, CNRS/LIX, École Polytechnique, France
- Felix Joos, Universität Heidelberg, Germany
- Martina Juhnke, University of Osnabrück, Germany
- Brendan McKay, Australian National University, Australia
- Iain Moffat, Royal Holloway, University of London, United Kingdom
- Sang-il Oum, Institute for Basic Science, South Korea
- Greta Panova, University of Southern California, United States
- Alexey Pokrovskiy, University College London, United Kingdom
- Gordon Royle, University of Western Australia, Australia
- Bruce Sagan, Michigan State University, United States
- Paco Santos, University of Cantabria, Spain
- Maya Stein, University of Chile, Chile
- Sophie Spirkl, University of Waterloo, Canada
- Maya Stein, Universidad de Chile, Chile
- Christian Stump, Ruhr University Bochum, Germany
- István Tomon, Umeå University, Sweden
- Edwin van Dam, Tilburg University, Netherlands
- Ian Wanless, Monash University, Australia
- David Wood, Monash University, Australia
- Qing Xiang, Southern University of Science and Technology, China

Since 2013, one of the editors-in-chief has been designated the Chief Editorial Officer. The present officer is Ian Wanless.

=== Past ===
The following people have been editors-in-chief of the Electronic Journal of Combinatorics:

- Herbert Wilf (1994–2001)
- Fan Chung Graham (2000–2002)
- Peter Cameron (2001–2003)
- Carsten Thomassen (2002–2013)
- Richard Ehrenborg (2003–2004)
- Chris Godsil (2004–2008)
- Catherine Greenhill
- E. Rodney Canfield (2006–2021)
- Willem Haemers (2008–2013)
- Catherine Yan (2010–2013)
- Bojan Mohar
- Marc Noy
- József Solymosi (2013–2015)
- David Conlon (2015–2020)
- Svante Linusson (2015–2020)
- Michael Krivelevich

== Dynamic surveys ==
In addition to publishing normal articles, the journal also contains a class of articles called Dynamic Surveys that are not assigned to volumes and can be repeatedly updated by the authors.

== Open access ==
Since its inception, the journal has operated under the diamond-model open access model, charging no fees to either authors or readers. It is a founding member of the Free Journal Network.

== Copyright ==
Since its inception, the journal has left copyright of all published material with its authors. Instead, authors provide the journal with an irrevocable licence to publish and agree that any further publication of the material acknowledges the journal. Since 2018, authors have been strongly encouraged to release their articles under a Creative Commons license.
