= Combinatorial Mathematics Society of Australasia =

The Combinatorial Mathematics Society of Australasia (CMSA) is a professional society of mathematicians working in the field of combinatorics. It is the primary combinatorics society for Australasia, consisting of Australia, New Zealand and neighbouring countries. The CMSA existed as an informal group from 1972 until formal establishment in 1978. It became an incorporated association in 1996, and as of 2017, it has over 280 members including 110 life members.

== Membership and management ==
The membership of the CMSA consists of four classes: ordinary members, honorary members, institutional members, and life members.

The CMSA Council is responsible for all activities of the Society. It consists of a president, vice-president, immediate past president (if there is one), secretary, treasurer, and a number of other members elected by members of the CMSA at its Annual General Meeting.

=== CMSA presidents ===
Presidents of the CMSA are shown below.

- Anne Penfold Street (1997–98)
- Derek Holton (1999–2001)
- Nick Wormald (2002–03)
- Brendan McKay (2004)
- Paul Bonnington (2005–06)
- Ian Wanless (2007–09)
- Robert Aldred (2010)
- Catherine Greenhill (2011–13)
- Ian Wanless (2014)
- David Wood (2015–16)
- Sanming Zhou (2017)
- Jeanette McLeod (2018–20)
- Brendan McKay (2021)
- Thomas Britz (2022–2024)
- Ian Wanless (2025)
- Binzhou Xia (2026)

== Activities ==
The main activities of the CMSA are to publish the Australasian Journal of Combinatorics (AJC), and to oversee the organisation of the annual Australasian Conference on Combinatorial Mathematics and Combinatorial Computing (ACCMCC), and the ten-yearly International Combinatorics Conference (ICC). The CMSA also publishes an E-Newsletter in April, July, and October each year.

=== Student support ===
The CMSA strongly encourages student participation in its conferences. The CMSA Student Support Scheme provides travel support, and the CMSA Anne Penfold Street Student Prize (formerly called the CMSA Student Prize, 2001–16) is awarded annually for the best student talk.

== CMSA Medal ==
The CMSA Medal is awarded at most every three years, to honour a member of the CMSA who has made outstanding and sustained contributions to combinatorics and to the Australasian combinatorics community.

The following individuals have been awarded the CMSA Medal:

- Anne Penfold Street (1999)
- Derek Holton (2005)
- Jennifer Seberry (2008)
- Elizabeth Billington (2011)
- Brendan McKay (2014)
- Darryn Bryant (2019)
- Ian Wanless (2022)
- Nick Wormald (2025)

== CMSA Prize ==
The CMSA Prize is awarded for excellence in a single body of research in combinatorial mathematics.

The following individuals have been awarded the CMSA Prize.

- Nina Kamčev (2023)
