= Jeanette McLeod =

New Zealand mathematician

Jeanette Claire McLeod is a New Zealand mathematician specialising in combinatorics, including the theories of Latin squares and random graphs. She is a senior lecturer in the School of Mathematics and Statistics at the University of Canterbury, a principal investigator for Te Pūnaha Matatini, a Centre of Research Excellence associated with the University of Auckland, an honorary senior lecturer at the Australian National University, and the president for a term of three years from 2018 to 2020 of the Combinatorial Mathematics Society of Australasia.

McLeod earned her Ph.D. in 2007 from Australian National University. Her dissertation, Methods in Asymptotic Combinatorics, was supervised by Brendan McKay. She is one of the cofounders of Maths Craft New Zealand, a project to popularise mathematics using crafts such as crochet and origami.

In 2019, McLeod and fellow Canterbury mathematician Phil Wilson won the Cranwell Medal for Science Communication from the New Zealand Association of Scientists for their work on Maths Craft. McLeod's advocacy for creative practice within science and research saw her profiled in a Nature careers article in 2021.
