= Sarah Léon =

French writer (born 1995)

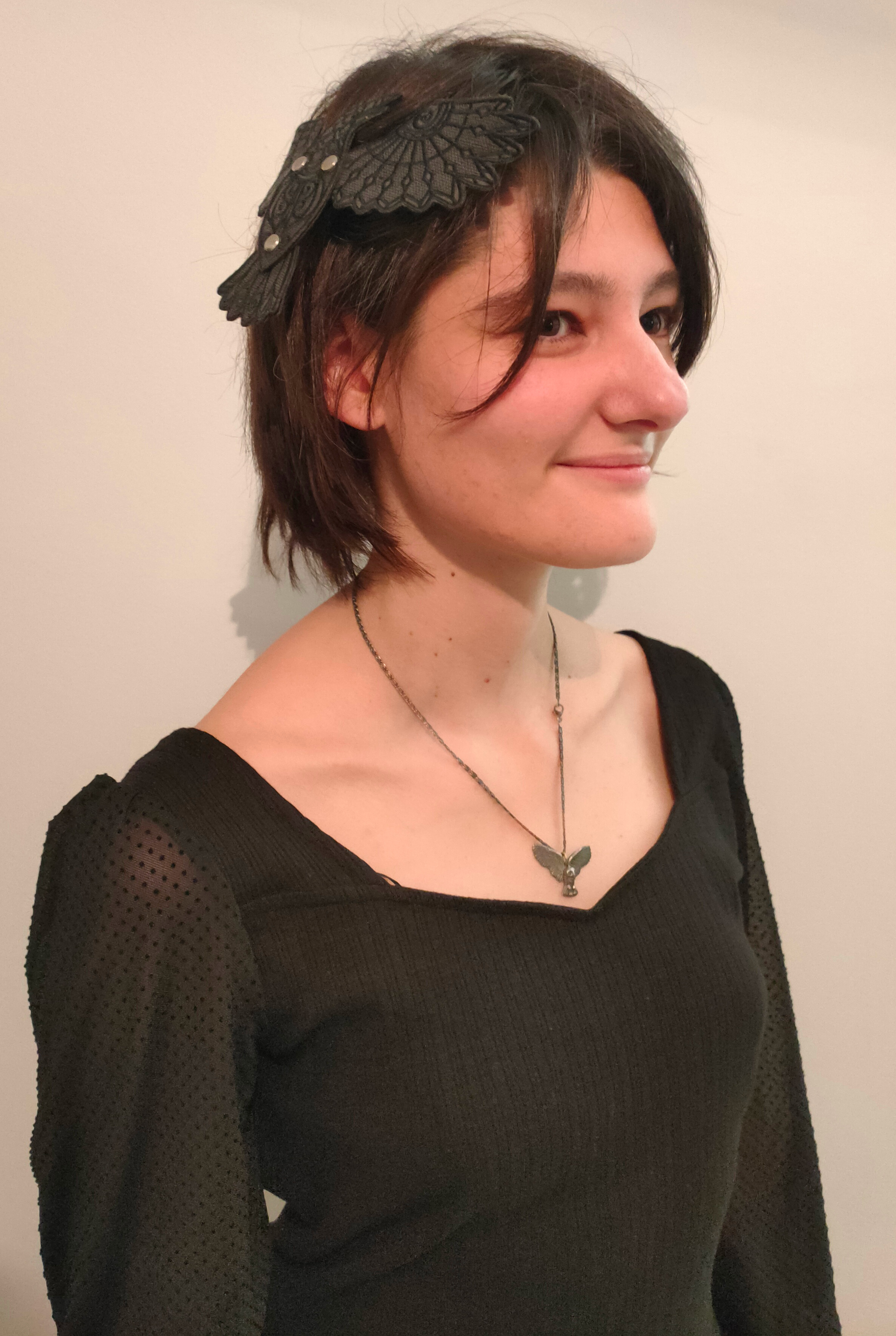
- Portrait picture of Sarah Léon in 2022
- Alma mater: École normale supérieure

Sarah Léon is a French writer. She was born 1995 and studied at the École normale supérieure in Paris. She won the Prix Clara in 2012 for her story "Mon Alban". Her debut novel Wanderer was published in 2016. It appeared in English translation in 2019, with the translation done by John Cullen.
