= Richard Ehrenborg =

Swedish mathematician

- Education: Massachusetts Institute of Technology
- Scientific career
- Fields: Mathematics
- Workplaces: University of Kentucky
- Thesis: Combinatorial methods in multilinear algebra (1993)
- Doctoral advisor: Gian-Carlo Rota
- Website: https://www.ms.uky.edu/~jrge/

Richard Ehrenborg is a Swedish mathematician working in algebraic combinatorics. He is known for developing the quasisymmetric function of a poset. He currently holds the Ralph E. and Norma L. Edwards Research Professorship at the University of Kentucky and is the first recipient of the Royster Research Professor at University of Kentucky.

Ehrenborg earned his Ph.D. from MIT in 1993 under the supervision of Gian-Carlo Rota. He is a descendant of another Richard Ehrenborg, (born 1655) who was a professor and Rektor of Lund University. He is also a juggler and magician.

== Selected publications ==
- Ehrenborg, Richard (1996). "On posets and Hopf algebras". Advances in Mathematics. 119 (1): 1–25. doi:10.1006/aima.1996.0026. ISSN 0001-8708. MR 1383883.
- Ehrenborg, Richard; Skinner, Chris M (1995). "The blind bartender's problem". Journal of Combinatorial Theory, Series A. 70 (2): 249–266. doi:10.1016/0097-3165(95)90092-6. ISSN 0097-3165. MR 1329391.

== See also ==
- Four glasses puzzle
