= Stanisław Radziszowski =

Polish-American mathematician and computer scientist

Stanisław P. Radziszowski (born June 7, 1953) is a Polish-American mathematician and computer scientist, best known for his work in Ramsey theory.

Radziszowski was born in Gdańsk, Poland, and received his PhD from the Institute of Informatics of the University of Warsaw in 1980. His thesis topic was "Logic and Complexity of Synchronous Parallel Computations". From 1976 to 1980 he worked as a visiting professor in various universities in Mexico City. In 1984, he moved to the United States, where he took up a position in the Department of Computer Science at the Rochester Institute of Technology.

Radziszowski has published many papers in graph theory, Ramsey theory, block designs, number theory and computational complexity.

In a 1995 paper with Brendan McKay he determined the Ramsey number R(4,5)=25. His survey of Ramsey numbers, last updated in June 2024, is a standard reference on the subject and published at the Electronic Journal of Combinatorics.
