= Kathy Horadam =

Australian mathematician

Kathryn Jennifer Horadam (born 1951) is an Australian mathematician known for her work on Hadamard matrices and related topics in mathematics and information security. She is an emeritus professor at the Royal Melbourne Institute of Technology (RMIT).

== Life ==
Horadam is one of the three children of mathematicians Alwyn Horadam and Eleanor Mollie Horadam, and was born in 1951 in Armidale, New South Wales. She studied mathematics at Australian National University, earning a bachelor's degree in 1972 and completing her PhD in 1977. Her dissertation, The Homology of Groupnets, was supervised by Neville Smythe.

She worked for over 30 years at RMIT, becoming a professor of mathematics there in 1995. Additionally, she worked for three years in the Defence Science and Technology Group.

== Book ==
Horadam is the author of the book Hadamard Matrices and Their Applications (Princeton University Press, 2007).

== Recognition ==
Horadam became a fellow of the Institute of Combinatorics and its Applications in 1991 and of the Australian Mathematical Society in 2001. An international workshop on Hadamard matrices was held at RMIT in 2011 in honour of her 60th birthday, and papers from the workshop were published in 2013 as a special issue of the Australasian Journal of Combinatorics.
