= Centre Mersenne =

Publisher in Grenoble, France

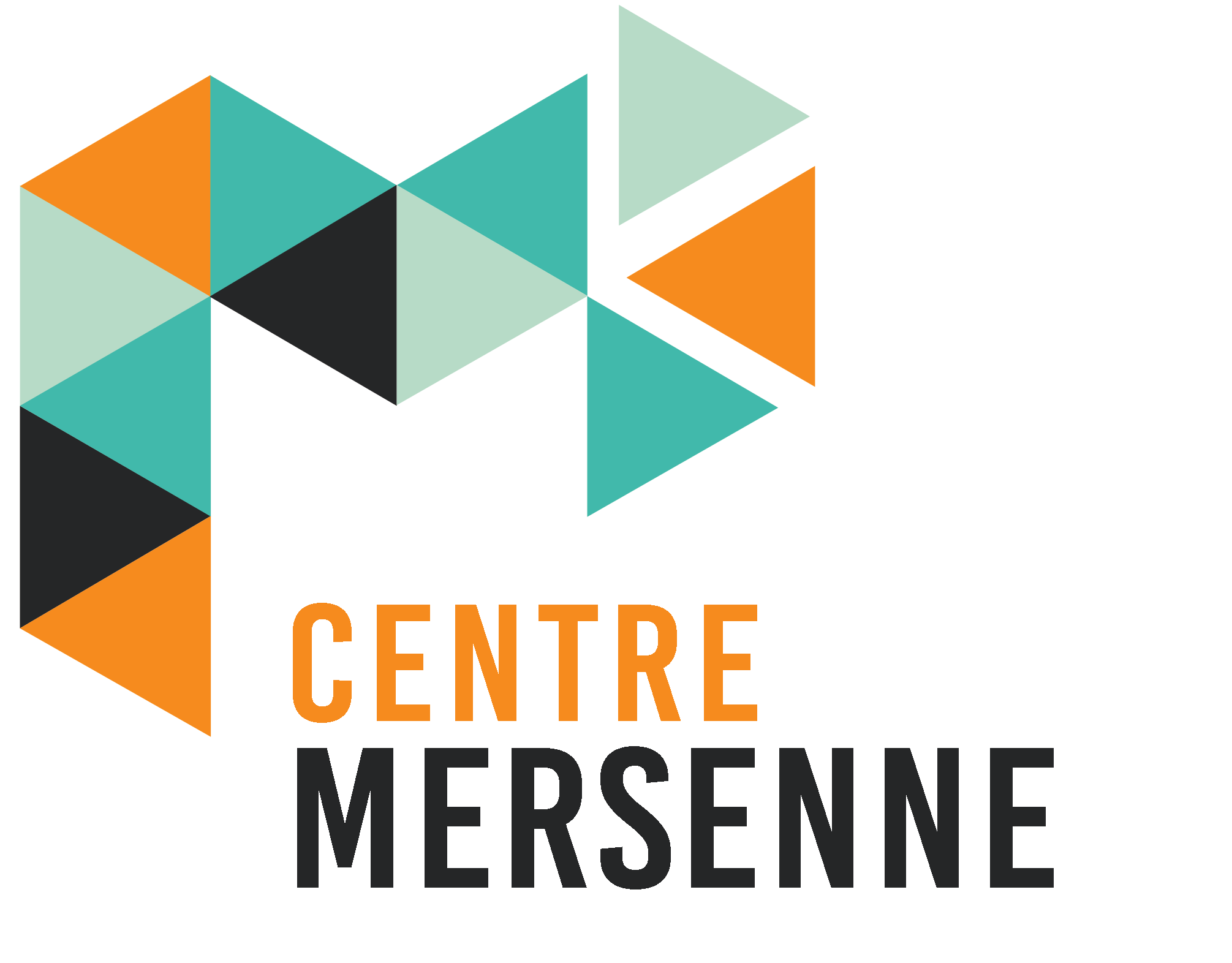
- Predecessor: Cedram
- Founded: January 2018
- Country of origin: France
- Distribution: Online
- Publication types: Scientific journals
- Owner: Mathdoc
- Official website: www.centre-mersenne.org

The Centre Mersenne is a publishing center to help open-access mathematical journals. The Centre Mersenne is located in Grenoble, France. It operates in partnership with UGA Éditions. It is supported by CNRS and Université Grenoble Alpes (UGA), with a funding from the Grenoble IDEX. The Centre Mersenne is named after Marin Mersenne.

Some academic journals published by Centre Mersenne:

- Algebraic Combinatorics
- Annales Henri Lebesgue
- Annales de la faculté des sciences de Toulouse
- Annales de l'Institut Fourier
- Annales mathématiques Blaise Pascal
- Confluentes Mathematici
- Journal de l'École polytechnique — Mathématiques
- Journal de théorie des nombres de Bordeaux
- MathS In Action
- Publications Mathématiques de Besançon - Algèbre et Théorie des Nombres
- SMAI Journal of Computational Mathematics
