= Reinhard Diestel =

German mathematician

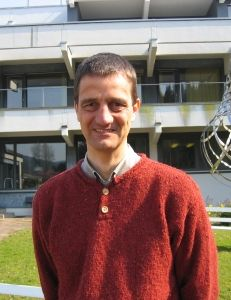
- Diestel in 2007
- Education: University of Cambridge
- Scientific career
- Fields: Mathematics
- Workplaces: St John's College, Cambridge; Chemnitz University of Technology; University of Hamburg
- Thesis: Simplicial Decompositions and Universal Graphs (1986)
- Doctoral advisor: Béla Bollobás
- Doctoral students: Daniela Kühn; Maya Stein
- Website: www.math.uni-hamburg.de/home/diestel/

Reinhard Diestel (born 1959) is a German mathematician specializing in graph theory, including the interplay among graph minors, matroid theory, tree decomposition, and infinite graphs. He holds the chair of discrete mathematics at the University of Hamburg.

== Education and career ==
Diestel has a Ph.D. from the University of Cambridge in England, completed in 1986. His dissertation, Simplicial Decompositions and Universal Graphs, was supervised by Béla Bollobás.

He continued at Cambridge as a fellow of St. John's College, Cambridge until 1990. In 1994, he took a professorship at the Chemnitz University of Technology, and in 1999 he was given his current chair at the University of Hamburg.

At Hamburg, his doctoral students have included Daniela Kühn and Maya Stein.

== Books ==
Diestel's books include:

- Graph Decompositions: A Study in Infinite Graph Theory (Oxford University Press, 1990)
- Graph Theory (Graduate Texts in Mathematics 173, Springer, 1997; 6th ed., 2024). Originally published in German as Graphentheorie (1996), and translated into Chinese, Japanese, and Russian.
- Tangles: A Structural Approach to Artificial Intelligence in the Empirical Sciences (Cambridge University Press, 2024; arXiv:2006.01830)
