= Gordon Royle =

Australian mathematician

Gordon F. Royle is a professor at the School of Mathematics and Statistics at The University of Western Australia.

Royle is the co-author (with Chris Godsil) of the book Algebraic Graph Theory (Springer Verlag, 2001, ISBN 0-387-95220-9). Royle is also known for his research into the mathematics of Sudoku and his search for the Sudoku puzzle with the smallest number of entries that has a unique solution.

Royle earned his Ph.D. in 1987 from the University of Western Australia under the supervision of Cheryl Praeger and Brendan McKay.
