= Ian Wanless =

Australian mathematician

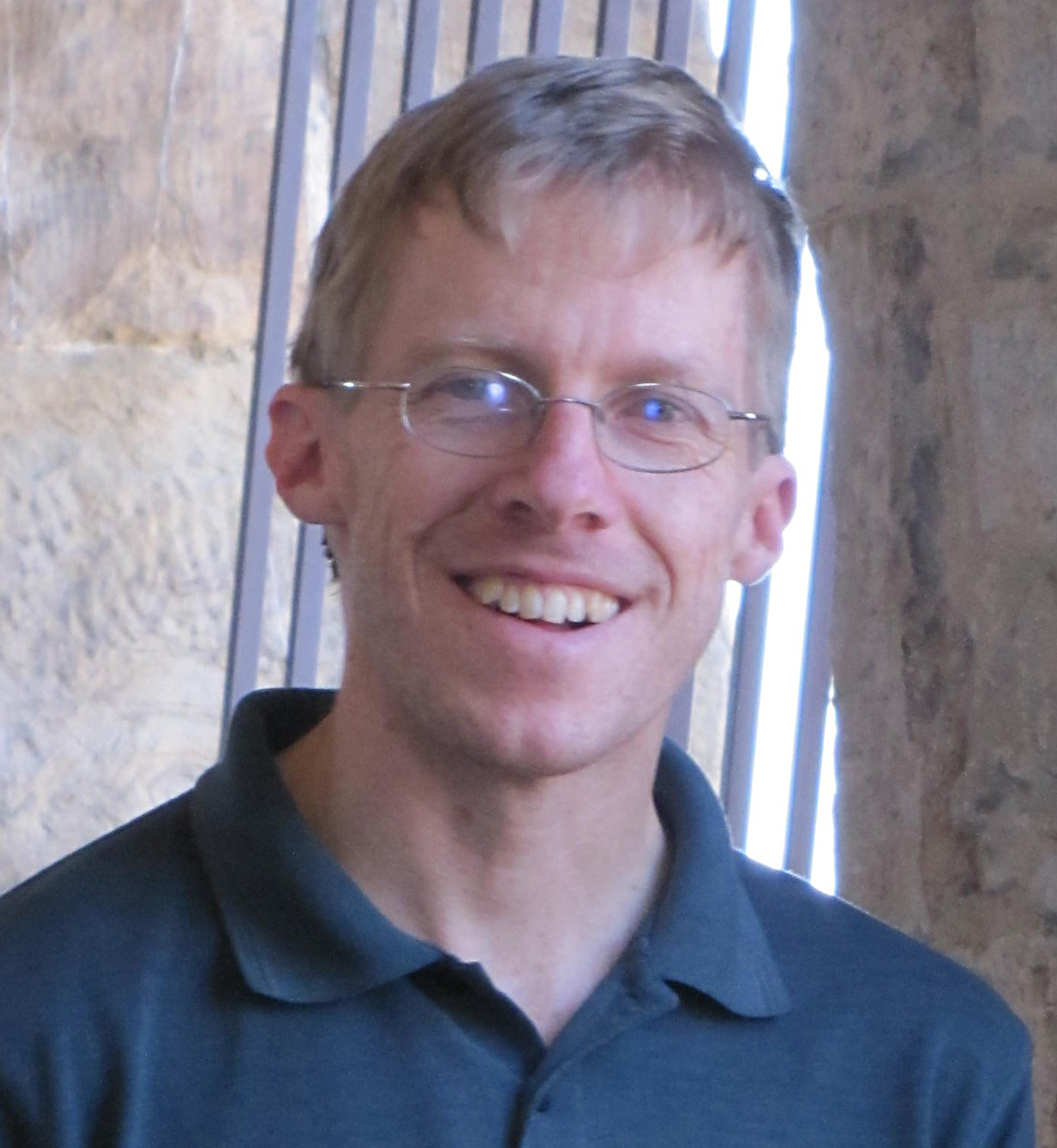
Self-portrait photograph

Ian Murray Wanless (born 7 December 1969 in Canberra, Australia) is an Australian mathematician. He is a professor in the School of Mathematics at Monash University in Melbourne, Australia. His research area is combinatorics, principally Latin squares, graph theory and matrix permanents.

Wanless completed his secondary education at Phillip College and represented Australia at the International Mathematical Olympiad in Cuba in 1987.

Wanless received a Ph.D. in mathematics from the Australian National University in 1998. His thesis "Permanents, matchings and Latin rectangles" was supervised by Brendan McKay. He held a postdoctoral research position at Melbourne University (1998–1999), before becoming a junior research fellow at Christ Church, Oxford (1999–2003). He then had a research position at Australian National University (2003–2004) before spending 2005 as a senior lecturer at Charles Darwin University. Since 2006 he has been at Monash University, where he was promoted to professor in 2014.

He has been awarded distinguished fellowships from the Australian Research Council including a QEII fellowship (2006–2010) and a Future Fellowship (2011–2014). The Institute of Combinatorics and its Applications awarded him its Kirkman Medal in 2002 and its Hall Medal in 2008. The Australian Institute of Policy and Science awarded him a Victorian Young Tall Poppy Award in 2008. The Australian Mathematical Society awarded him its medal in 2009.

Wanless is a life member of the Combinatorial Mathematics Society of Australasia (CMSA). He has served two terms as the CMSA's President (2007–09 and 2014). He is an editor in chief of the Electronic Journal of Combinatorics and is on the editorial board of several other journals including the Journal of Combinatorial Designs.

Wanless is the coauthor (with Charles Colbourn and Jeff Dinitz) of the chapter on Latin squares in the CRC Handbook of Combinatorial Designs and the author of the chapter on matrix permanents in the CRC Handbook of Linear Algebra.
