= École normale supérieure de Rennes =

Higher learning institution in Rennes, France

- School logotype
- Type: ENS (informal), Grande Ecole, EPCSCP
- Established: 2013 or 1994 as a branch of ENS Paris-Saclay
- Director: Pascal Mognol
- Academic staff: 245
- Undergraduates: 300
- Postgraduates: 250
- Location: Rennes, France; 48.0457°N 1.7456°W
- Colours: Blue, White
- Affiliations: Conférence des grandes écoles
- Website: ens-rennes.fr

The École normale supérieure de Rennes (French pronunciation: [ekɔl nɔʁmal sypeʁjœʁ də ʁɛn]), also called ENS Rennes is a French scientific grande école, belonging to the network of écoles normales supérieures established according to the model of the École normale supérieure in Paris. Like its sister universities, its mandate lies in training students with a view to careers in academia, engineering and government.

Established by a decree of the 17 October 2013 of the Prime Minister, the ENS Rennes is placed under the direct authority of the Ministry of Higher Education and Research, and is a founder of the European University of Brittany. Before 2013, it was a branch of the École normale supérieure de Paris-Saclay, but the great geographical distance between Cachan and Rennes gradually led to its being granted a greater level of autonomy.

The school is divided into five departments, which have a yearly intake of eighty to 100 normaliens, i. e. students who are granted the status of paid civil servants. Like the other grandes écoles in the French higher education system, these students are selected through highly selective entrance examinations called concours, after at least two years of preparatory tuition in schools known as classes préparatoire aux grandes écoles. As well as these paid students; the school also admits attendees called magistériens, including international students. These two groups of students, despite their different status, receive similar tuition over a four-year period. The ENS Rennes records high levels of success in steering its students towards research-oriented careers; indeed, more than eighty percent of any year-group take and pass the agrégation, a French national competitive examination for entrance into careers in academia, and some seventy percent go on to undertake a PhD program.

== History ==
=== Establishment of the ENS Rennes : from a branch to an independent school (1994-2013) ===
The ENS Rennes was founded in the early 90's as a second campus of the ENS Cachan. 1994 was the official establishing of the future ENS Rennes, under the name of Antenne de Bretagne de l'ENS Cachan. It had then only two departments of engineering, and hosted roughly 40 students. During the next two decades, it hosted more and more students from the ENS Cachan, while building relationships with local institutions such as the IRMAR, the INSA Rennes, and especially with the two universities of Rennes. The departments of management and of mathematics were created respectively in 1995 and 1996, and in 2002 were created the departments of sports sciences and of computer science. In 2013, it became an independent institution and changed its name to ENS Rennes.

== Campus and student life ==
=== School site ===
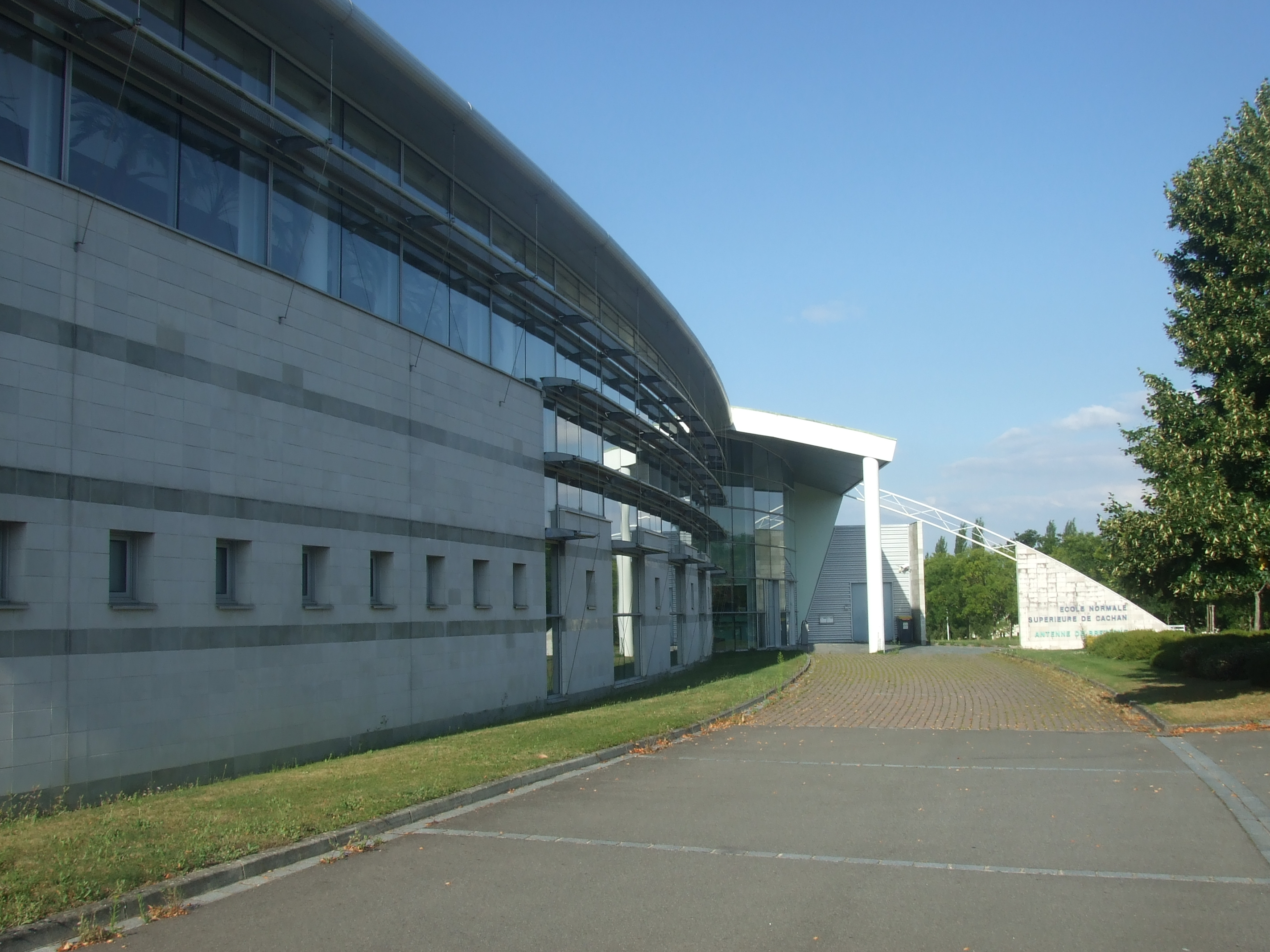
Entrance of the school, in 2009

== School organization ==
=== Current and former teachers ===
Karine Beauchard

== Annales Henri Lebesgue ==
The Annales Henri Lebesgue is a peer-reviewed open-access scientific journal covering mathematics that was established in 2018. The journal is owned by the École Normale Supérieure de Rennes (ENS Rennes), administratively managed with the help of the Centre Henri Lebesgue, and hosted by the Centre Mersenne from the Centre national de la recherche scientifique. It is open access and free of author charges, supported by public institutions. Amongst the objectives of the journal are the promotion of responsible practices in scientific publishing and the guarantee of public availability of mathematical works in the long term.

== See also ==
=== Close articles ===
- ENS Ulm
- ENS Lyon
- ENS Paris-Saclay
- Classe préparatoire aux grandes écoles

=== External links ===
- official website of the École normale supérieure de Rennes
- Annales Henri Lebesgue
