= Nick Wormald =

Australian mathematician

Nicholas Charles Wormald FAA (born 1953) is an Australian mathematician and professor of mathematics at Monash University. He specializes in probabilistic combinatorics, graph theory, graph algorithms, Steiner trees, web graphs, mine optimization, and other areas in combinatorics.

In 1979, Wormald earned a Ph.D. in mathematics from the University of Newcastle with a dissertation titled Some problems in the enumeration of labelled graphs.

In 2006, he won the Euler Medal from the Institute of Combinatorics and its Applications. He has held the Canada Research Chair in Combinatorics and Optimization at the University of Waterloo. In 2012, he was recognized with an Australian Laureate Fellowship for his achievements. In 2017, he was elected as a Fellow of the Australian Academy of Science.

In 2018, Wormald was an invited speaker at the International Congress of Mathematicians in Rio de Janeiro.

== Selected publications ==
- Nicholas C. Wormald (1999). "Models of random regular graphs" (PDF). London Mathematical Society Lecture Note Series. Cambridge University Press: 239–298.
- Peter Eades; Nicholas C. Wormald (1994). "Edge crossings in drawings of bipartite graphs". Algorithmica. 11 (4). Springer: 379–403. doi:10.1007/BF01187020. S2CID 22476033.
- Nicholas C. Wormald (1995). "Differential equations for random processes and random graphs". Annals of Applied Probability. 5 (4). JSTOR: 1217–1235. doi:10.1214/aoap/1177004612.
- Nicholas C Wormald (1999). "The differential equation method for random graph processes and greedy algorithms" (PDF). Lectures on Approximation and Randomized Algorithms. Citeseer: 73–155.
- Robert W. Robinson; Nicholas C. Wormald (1994). "Almost all regular graphs are Hamiltonian". Random Structures & Algorithms. 5 (2). Wiley Online Library: 363–374. doi:10.1002/rsa.3240050209. Archived from the original on 14 October 2013.
- Brendan D McKay; Nicholas C Wormald (1991). "Asymptotic enumeration by degree sequence of graphs with degrees o ( n ½ ) " (PDF). Combinatorica. 11 (4). Springer: 369–382. doi:10.1007/bf01275671. S2CID 9228526.
- Angelika Steger; Nicholas C. Wormald (1999). "Generating random regular graphs quickly". Combinatorics, Probability and Computing. 8 (4). Cambridge Univ Press: 377–396. doi:10.1017/S0963548399003867. S2CID 14545326. Archived from the original on 3 November 2013.
- Nicholas C. Wormald (1981). "The asymptotic connectivity of labelled regular graphs". Journal of Combinatorial Theory. Series B. 31 (2). Elsevier: 156–167. doi:10.1016/S0095-8956(81)80021-4.
