= Combinatorial Theory (journal) =

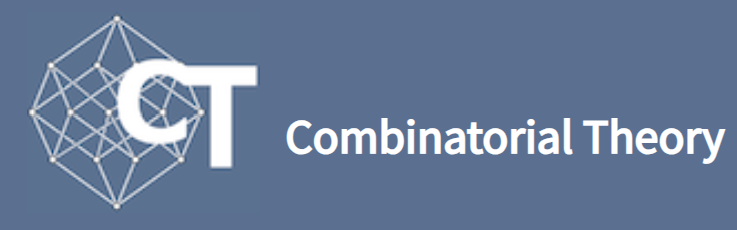
- Discipline: Mathematics
- Language: English

Publication details
- History: 2021–present
- Publisher: California Digital Library
- Frequency: 3/year
- Open access: Yes
- License: CC BY

Standard abbreviations
- ISO 4: Comb. Theory

Indexing
- ISSN: 2766-1334
- LCCN: 2020202482
- OCLC no.: 1225296429

Links
- Journal homepage

Combinatorial Theory is a peer-reviewed diamond open access mathematical journal specializing in the field of combinatorics. It was established in 2021, when the vast majority of the editorial board of the Elsevier-published Journal of Combinatorial Theory, Series A left to create a new journal.

== Operations ==
The journal operates on a diamond open access model, in which publication costs are underwritten by voluntary contributions from universities, foundations, and other organizations. Authors do not pay submission fees or article processing charges, and the journal belongs to the Free Journal Network. All content is published under a Creative Commons license. The journal follows a doubly-anonymous review process, in which author names are not disclosed to reviewers.

== Abstracting and indexing ==
The journal is abstracted and indexed in the Directory of Open Access Journals, the Free Journal Network, Mathematical Reviews, Zentralblatt Math, and Scopus.
