= Maya Stein =

German-Chilean mathematician

Maya Jakobine Stein is a German mathematician working as a professor at the Department of Mathematical Engineering of the University of Chile. She is also the vice director and the academic director of the Center for Mathematical Modeling of the University of Chile.

After earning a degree in mathematics from the University of Hamburg in 2002, she continued for a doctorate in 2005, supervised by Reinhard Diestel. She then spent three years as a postdoctoral researcher at the University of São Paulo with Yoshiharu Kohayakawa, before moving to the University of Chile as an associated researcher in 2008. She obtained an associate professor position in 2016 and was promoted to full professor in 2020.

Stein is known for her research in combinatorics, in particular in graph theory, and her interests include extremal and probabilistic combinatorics, Ramsey theory, as well as structural and algorithmic graph theory and infinite graphs. She has more than 60 publications in these areas. She is the vice-chair of the SIAM activity group for discrete mathematics.

== Editorial positions ==
- Managing editor for Innovations in Graph Theory
- Editor-in-Chief for Electronic Journal of Combinatorics
- Associate editor for SIAM Journal on Discrete Mathematics
- Associate editor for Orbita Mathematicae
