= Chunwei Song =

Chinese mathematician

Chunwei Song is a Chinese mathematician who specializes in combinatorics, graph theory, and intellectual history. He is a professor of mathematics at Peking University.

== Education and career ==
Song received his Ph.D. in 2004 from the University of Pennsylvania, with the dissertation Combinatorial Theory of $q,t$-Schröder Polynomials, Parking Functions and Trees under the supervision of Professor James Haglund.

Prior to joining Peking University, Song held visiting faculty positions at Boston College in Massachusetts and Tokyo Institute of Technology in Japan. From 2005 to 2006, he served as a visiting associate professor in the Department of Mathematical and Computing Science at the Tokyo Institute of Technology (now Science Tokyo). In 2010, he was a visiting associate professor at the University of Delaware.

== Research contributions ==
Song is the author of Lattice Path Combinatorics and Special Counting Sequences: From an Enumerative Perspective, CRC Press, Boca Raton, ISBN 978-1032671758.

Coauthored with Chen Dayue (陈大岳) and Xu Zhongqin (许忠勤), Song is a main editor of the tribute volume Ding Shisun and Chinese Mathematics (《丁石孙与中国数学》).

Song also has scholarly interests in Chinese and East Asian intellectual history. He is the author of Heroes Brought Buddhism to the East of the Sea: A Fully Annotated Translation of The Preface of Haedong Kosŭng Chŏn, published in Sino-Platonic Papers (Issue 183).

== Academic talks ==
In 2014, Song gave a talk at Academia Sinica titled The Art of Lattice Path Combinatorics and Combinatorial Statistics.

In 2021, Song delivered an invited talk at the 14th International Congress on Mathematical Education (ICME 14) at its Thematic Afternoon activities.

In 2022, he gave a Plenary Address at the 11th National Forum on Mathematics Culture organized by the Chinese Mathematical Society.

== Editorial boards ==
Song is on the editorial boards of Enumerative Combinatorics and Applications, Advances and Applications in Discrete Mathematics, Frontiers of Mathematics, and several other academic journals.

== Recognition and influences ==
Song was a Council Member of both the 12th and the 13th Councils of the Chinese Mathematical Society.

In 2023, Song became an elected delegate of the Beijing Municipal People's Congress.

As a scholar, he contributes opinion pieces to prominent media outlets such as Phoenix Weekly, Southern Metropolis Daily, The Madrid Metropolitan, and The Daily Pakistan. His writings engage diverse audiences across various countries, offering insightful and impactful perspectives on a wide range of themes.
