= École normale supérieure =

Type of state-run institute of higher education in France

An École normale supérieure (English: Institute of Advanced Education; French pronunciation: [ekɔl nɔʁmal sypeʁjœʁ]) or ENS is a type of elite public higher education institution in France. A portion of the student body, admitted via a highly-selective competitive examination process, are French civil servants and are known as normaliens. However, normalien also designate the part of the student body that is selected through a highly-selective application system and follow the same cursus as their civil servants counterpart. ENSes also offer master's and PhD degrees, and can be compared to "Institutes for Advanced Studies". They constitute the top level of research-training education in the French university system.

The history of écoles normales supérieures goes back to 30 October 1794 (9 brumaire an III), when École normale de l'an III was established during the French Revolution. The school was subsequently reestablished as pensionnat normal from 1808 to 1822, before being recreated in 1826 and taking the name of École normale in 1830. When institutes for primary teachers training called écoles normales were created in 1845, the word supérieure (meaning upper) was added to form the current name.

The Savary Law of 1984 restructured higher education in France and classified écoles normales supérieures within the category of établissements publics à caractère scientifique, culturel et professionnel.

As of January 2014, there are four existing ENSes:

- École normale supérieure, located in Paris
- École normale supérieure de Lyon, located in Lyon
- École normale supérieure Paris-Saclay, located in Gif-sur-Yvette, near Paris
- École normale supérieure de Rennes, located in Rennes

A twin institution has existed in Italy since its foundation by Napoleon Bonaparte, the Scuola Normale Superiore in Pisa.

== History ==
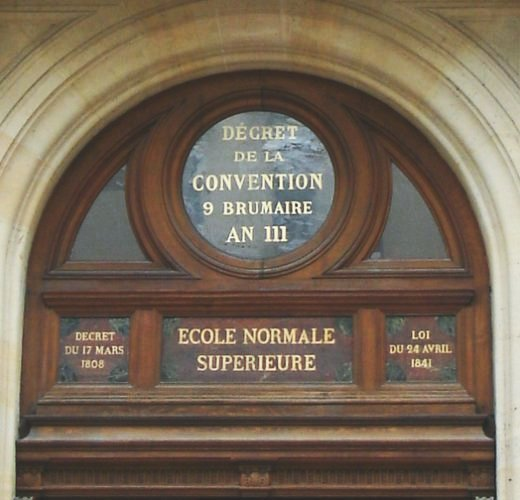
Key decrees and laws on the upper part of the entrance of École Normale Supérieure, 45 rue d'Ulm

After the suppression of the Society of Jesus in France in 1762, a debate arose on how to replace their role in education. The idea of an école normale, a place to train teachers for the secondary schools, is already mentioned in a report on education made in 1768 by Rolland, president of the Parlement of Paris.

The first école normale was established by the National Convention in a decree dated 30 October 1794. Educated people from all parts of France were to be selected to attend the school and to subsequently return to found an école normale in their department for the education of primary school teachers. The école normale de l'an III had renowned teachers such as Laplace, Lagrange, and Berthollet but actually only functioned for four months, from 20 January 1795 to 19 May 1795 or in the then in use French Republican Calendar from 1er pluviose of year III until 30 floréal of year III.

In the decree of Napoleon of 17 March 1808, the institution was re-established as pensionnat normal. The candidates most promising for administration and education roles were admitted through a competitive examination. The students could attend courses at Collège de France, Muséum d'histoire naturelle or École polytechnique. At école normale, they received support from tutors for revising, laboratory experiments and teaching the art of teaching.

In 1880, Camille Sée established secondary education for girls. Subsequently, a law dated 29 July 1881 founded the École normale supérieure de jeunes filles located in Sèvres.

Jules Ferry got a law passed on 9 August 1879 in order to force each department to establish and fund an institution to train primary school teachers for each gender (école normale de garçons and école normale de filles). In order to train the teaching body of these schools, so-called écoles normales supérieures de l’enseignement primaire were needed. A decree dated 13 July 1880 set up the one for young women in Fontenay-aux-Roses, and later in March 1882 the male equivalent opened in Saint-Cloud.

Starting in 1891, a section for teacher training named sections normales was established in the École des Arts et métiers of Châlons-sur-Marne (decree of 11 June 1891) and in the École des Hautes Études Commerciales de Paris (decree of 21 July 1894). A decree published on 15 June 1899 organized sections normales for women. These sections normales were grouped together in 1912 into a single school which was named "École normale supérieure de l'enseignement technique" in 1934.

== Academic profile ==
The École normale supérieure are a specific type of Grandes Écoles, French institutions of higher education separate from, but parallel and connected to the main framework of the French public university system. Similar to the Ivy League in the United States, Oxbridge in the UK, and C9 League in China, Grandes Écoles are elite academic institutions that admit students through an extremely competitive process. Grandes Écoles typically have much smaller class sizes and student bodies than public universities in France, and many of their programs are taught in English. While most Grandes Écoles are more expensive than French universities, the École normale supérieure charges the same tuition fees: €243 annually at master's degree in 2021–2022. International internships, study abroad opportunities, and close ties with government and the corporate world are a hallmark of the Grandes Écoles. Degrees from École normale supérieure are accredited by the Conférence des Grandes Écoles and awarded by the Ministry of National Education (France) (French: Le Ministère de L'éducation Nationale). Alums go on to occupy elite positions within government, administration, and corporate firms in France.

The competitive entrance exams for admission to the ENSs are extremely selective. They recruit mainly from scientific and humanities Prépas, even though a small number of their students (fewer than 10 each year) are recruited separately on the basis of highly competitive exams. The students from France and other European Union countries recruited after a Classe préparatoire are considered civil servants in training, and as such paid a monthly salary, in exchange for an agreement to serve France for 10 years, including those of their studies.

The École normale supérieure located in Paris is nicknamed "Ulm" from its address rue d'Ulm (Ulm Street). It teaches sciences and humanities. École normale supérieure de Lyon in Lyon also teaches sciences and humanities. École normale supérieure Paris-Saclay located in Cachan, a suburb of Paris and École normale supérieure de Rennes located near Rennes teaches in 5 departements, which are: mechatronics, mathematics, informatics, sport sciences, earth sciences and law-economics-management.

Until recently and unlike most of the other grandes écoles, the écoles normales supérieures did not award any specific diplomas (students who had completed the curriculum they had agreed to with the office of the Dean upon arrival were simply entitled to be known as "ENS Alumni" or "Normaliens"), but they encourage their students to obtain university diplomas in partner institutions whilst providing extra classes and support. Many ENS students obtain more than one university diploma.

According to a calculation published in 2016 by Nature, the ENS Paris is the institution which, in proportion to the number of its alumni, has formed the greatest number of Nobel Prizes (0.00135 per capita) in the world, which allows it to get ahead of the prestigious California Institute of Technology (Caltech) and Harvard University (respectively 0.00067 and 0.00032 per capita).
