= David Horadam =

David John Horadam
- Born: David John Horadam; 1883 Glendon, New South Wales
- Died: 5 May 1915 (aged 31–32) Toowoomba, Queensland
- School: Roughit Public School
- Occupation: Carpenter

Rugby union career
- Position: prop
International career
| Years | Team | Apps | (Points) |
| 1913 | Wallabies | 1 | (0) |

David John Horadam (1883 – 5 May 1915) was a rugby union player who represented Australia.

Horadam, a prop, was born in Glendon, New South Wales and claimed 1 international rugby cap for Australia.
