= Four glasses puzzle =

Logic puzzle

A four glasses puzzle solution. ? denote glasses in either state: face up or down. Ticks denote solved arrangements. In each step, only distinct arrangements are shown. In step 3, if a glass is face down, it is turned face up; otherwise, either glass is turned face down.

The four glasses puzzle, also known as the blind bartender's problem, is a logic puzzle first publicised by Martin Gardner in his "Mathematical Games" column in the February 1979 edition of Scientific American.

== Puzzle ==
Four glasses or tumblers are placed on the corners of a square Lazy Susan. Some of the glasses are upright (up) and some upside-down (down). A blindfolded person is seated next to the Lazy Susan and is required to re-arrange the glasses so that they are all up or all down, either arrangement being acceptable, which will be signalled by the ringing of a bell. The glasses may be re-arranged in turns subject to the following rules. Any two glasses may be inspected in one turn and after feeling their orientation the person may reverse the orientation of either, neither or both glasses. After each turn the Lazy Susan is rotated through a random angle. The puzzle is to devise an algorithm which allows the blindfolded person to ensure that all glasses have the same orientation (either up or down) in a finite number of turns. The algorithm must be non-stochastic i.e. it must not depend on luck.

== Solution ==
An algorithm that guarantees the bell will ring in at most five turns is as follows:

1. On the first turn choose a diagonally opposite pair of glasses and turn both glasses up.
2. On the second turn choose two adjacent glasses. At least one will be up as a result of the previous step. If the other is down, turn it up as well. If the bell does not ring, then there are now three glasses up and one down.
3. On the third turn choose a diagonally opposite pair of glasses. If one is down, turn it up and the bell will ring. If both are up, turn one down. There are now two glasses down, and they must be adjacent.
4. On the fourth turn choose two adjacent glasses and reverse both. If both were in the same orientation then the bell will ring. Otherwise there are now two glasses down and they must be diagonally opposite.
5. On the fifth turn choose a diagonally opposite pair of glasses and reverse both. The bell will ring.

== Generalisations ==
The puzzle can be generalised to n glasses instead of four. For two glasses it is trivially solved in one turn by inverting either glass. For three glasses there is a two-turn algorithm. For five or more glasses there is no algorithm that guarantees the bell will ring in a finite number of turns.

A further generalisation allows k glasses (instead of two) out of the n glasses to be examined at each turn. An algorithm can be found to ring the bell in a finite number of turns as long as k ≥ (1 − 1/p)n where p is the greatest prime factor of n.
