= Eleanor Mollie Horadam =

English-Australian mathematician

Eleanor Mollie Horadam (29 June 1921 – 5 May 2002) was an English-Australian mathematician specialising in the number theory of generalised integers.

== Life ==
Horadam was born in Dewsbury, Yorkshire. She read mathematics at Girton College, Cambridge. Then, while doing wartime service by day for Rolls-Royce performing stress–strain analysis of jet engines, she took night classes in engineering at the University of London, earning first-class honours there.

She moved to Australia by herself in 1949, becoming a lecturer at the University of New England. There, she married mathematician Alwyn Horadam and raised three children, persuading the university to update their maternity policies so that (unusually for the time) she could keep her position as a lecturer. She completed a doctorate and became a senior lecturer in 1965, retired in 1983, and was named a fellow of the university in 1995.

Her daughter Kathy Horadam, also became a mathematician.

== Mathematics ==
Horadam's research concerned generalised integers, formed from a sequence of real numbers greater than one (called generalised prime numbers) as the products of finite multisets of generalised primes.

She was also the author of a textbook published by the University of New England, Principles of mathematics for economists (1982).
