= Karine Beauchard =

French mathematician

Karine Beauchard (born 27 November 1978) is a French mathematician known for her research in control theory. She is a University Professor at the École normale supérieure de Rennes, and was the Peccot Lecturer of the Collège de France for 2007–2008.

== Education and career ==
From 1999 to 2003, Beauchard studied at the École normale supérieure Cachan. She earned her agrégation in 2002 and a Master of Advanced Studies in numerical analysis in 2003 through Pierre and Marie Curie University. She completed a doctorate in 2005 at the University of Paris-Sud; her dissertation, Contribution à l'étude de la contrôlabilité et la stabilisation de l'équation de Schrödinger, was directed by Jean-Michel Coron. She earned a habilitation in 2010 at Cachan, with a habilitation thesis on Analyse et contrôle de quelques équations aux dérivées partielles.

She worked at Cachan from 2005 to 2006, and as a chargée de recherche at CNRS from 2006 until 2014, when she took her present position as a professor at Rennes.

== Recognition ==
Beauchard was the Peccot Lecturer of the Collège de France for 2007–2008, giving a course on the control of Schrödinger equations. In 2017 she won the Michel-Monpetit Prize of the French Academy of Sciences. She became a junior member of the Institut Universitaire de France in 2018.
