= Algebraic Combinatorics (journal) =

- Discipline: Mathematics
- Language: English
- Edited by: Akihiro Munemasa, Satoshi Murai, Hendrik Van Maldeghem, Brendon Rhoades, David Speyer

Publication details
- History: 2018–present
- Publisher: The Combinatorics Consortium
- Frequency: 6/year
- Open access: Yes
- License: CC BY

Standard abbreviations
- ISO 4: Algebr. Comb.

Indexing
- ISSN: 2589-5486
- OCLC no.: 1059027046

Links
- Journal homepage

Algebraic Combinatorics is a peer-reviewed diamond open access mathematical journal specializing in the field of algebraic combinatorics. Established in 2018, the journal is published by The Combinatorics Consortium and web-published by the Centre Mersenne. It is a member of the Free Journal Network.

== History ==
The journal was established in 2018, when the editorial board of the Springer Science+Business Media Journal of Algebraic Combinatorics resigned to protest the publisher's high prices and limited accessibility. The board criticized Springer for "double-dipping", that is, charging large subscription fees to libraries in addition to high fees for authors who wished to make their publications open access.

== Operations ==
Algebraic Combinatorics operates on a diamond open access model, in which publication costs are underwritten by voluntary contributions from universities, foundations, and other organizations. Authors do not pay submission fees or article processing charges. All content is published under a Creative Commons license.

The journal's editors-in-chief are Akihiro Munemasa (Tohoku University), Satoshi Murai (Waseda University), Hendrik Van Maldeghem (Ghent University), Brendon Rhoades (University of California, San Diego), and David Speyer (University of Michigan).

== Abstracting and indexing ==
The journal is abstracted and indexed in the Web of Science, Directory of Open Access Journals, Scopus, Mathematical Reviews, and zbMath.
