= Australasian Journal of Combinatorics =

- Discipline: Combinatorics
- Language: English
- Edited by: Michael H. Albert and Elizabeth J. Billington

Publication details
- History: 1990–present
- Publisher: Centre for Discrete Mathematics and Computing (University of Queensland) on behalf of the Combinatorial Mathematics Society of Australasia (Australia)
- Frequency: Triannual
- Open access: Yes

Standard abbreviations
- ISO 4: Australas. J. Comb.
- MathSciNet: Australas. J. Combin.

Indexing
- ISSN: 1034-4942 (print); 2202-3518 (web)
- OCLC no.: 920391657

Links
- Journal homepage

The Australasian Journal of Combinatorics is a triannual peer-reviewed open-access scientific journal covering combinatorics. It was established in 1990 and is published by the Centre for Discrete Mathematics and Computing (University of Queensland) on behalf of the Combinatorial Mathematics Society of Australasia. Originally published biannually, it has been published three times per year since 2005. The editors-in-chief are Michael H. Albert (University of Otago) and Elizabeth J. Billington (University of Queensland). Since 2014, the journal has been diamond open access, charging fees neither to readers nor to authors. It is a member of the Free Journal Network.

== Abstracting and indexing ==
The journal is abstracted and indexed in Mathematical Reviews, the Emerging Sources Citation Index, Scopus, the Directory of Open Access Journals and Zentralblatt MATH.
