= Journal of Algebraic Combinatorics =

- Discipline: Algebraic combinatorics
- Language: English
- Edited by: Ilias S. Kotsireas

Publication details
- History: 1992-present
- Publisher: Springer Science+Business Media
- Frequency: 8/year
- Open access: Hybrid
- Impact factor: 0.875 (2020)

Standard abbreviations
- ISO 4: J. Algebr. Comb.
- MathSciNet: J. Algebraic Combin.

Indexing
- ISSN: 0925-9899 (print); 1572-9192 (web)
- LCCN: 93648949
- OCLC no.: 173857001

Links
- Journal homepage; Online archive

Journal of Algebraic Combinatorics is a peer-reviewed scientific journal covering algebraic combinatorics. It was established in 1992 and is published by Springer Science+Business Media. The editor-in-chief is Ilias S. Kotsireas (Wilfrid Laurier University).

In 2017, the journal's four editors-in-chief and editorial board resigned to protest the publisher's high prices and limited accessibility. They criticized Springer for "double-dipping", that is, charging large subscription fees to libraries in addition to high fees for authors who wished to make their publications open access. The board subsequently started their own open access journal, Algebraic Combinatorics.

== Abstracting and indexing ==
The journal is abstracted and indexed in:

- Current Contents/Physical, Chemical & Earth Sciences
- ProQuest databases
- Mathematical Reviews
- Referativnyi Zhurnal
- Science Citation Index Expanded
- Scopus
- Zentralblatt Math

According to the Journal Citation Reports, the journal has a 2020 impact factor of 0.875.
