= International Conference on Formal Power Series and Algebraic Combinatorics =

International academic conference

International Conference on Formal Power Series and Algebraic Combinatorics (FPSAC)
- Status: Active
- Genre: Algebraic and enumerative combinatorics
- Frequency: Annual
- Inaugurated: 1988
- Website: FPSAC/SFCA

The International Conference on Formal Power Series and Algebraic Combinatorics (FPSAC) is an annual academic conference in the areas of algebraic and enumerative combinatorics and their applications and relations with other areas of mathematics, physics, biology and computer science.

== History ==
FPSAC was first held in 1988 and has been held annually since 1990, typically in June or July.

The most recent conference in the series, FPSAC 2026, was held in July 2026 at the University of Washington in Seattle, Washington, USA. The next conference is slated to take place July 5-9, 2027 at University of Galway in Galway, Ireland.

The proceedings of conferences in the series have appeared variously as books published by the American Mathematical Society and Springer, and as issues in the journals Discrete Mathematics, Discrete Mathematics and Theoretical Computer Science, and Séminaire Lotharingien de Combinatoire.

Invited speakers at previous FPSAC conferences include Fields Medalist June Huh, Shaw Prize and Wolf Prize recipient Noga Alon, Steele Prize recipient Richard Stanley, and Wolf Prize and Steele Prize recipient Israel Gelfand.
