= Algebraic combinatorics =

Area of combinatorics

The Fano matroid, derived from the Fano plane. Matroids are one of many kinds of objects studied in algebraic combinatorics.

Algebraic combinatorics is an area of mathematics that employs methods of abstract algebra, notably group theory and representation theory, in various combinatorial contexts and, conversely, applies combinatorial techniques to problems in algebra.

== History ==
The term "algebraic combinatorics" was introduced in the late 1970s. Through the early or mid-1990s, typical combinatorial objects of interest in algebraic combinatorics either admitted much symmetry (association schemes, strongly regular graphs, posets with a group action) or possessed a rich algebraic structure, frequently of representation theoretic origin (symmetric functions, Young tableaux). This period is reflected in the area 05E, Algebraic combinatorics, of the AMS Mathematics Subject Classification, introduced in 1991.

== Scope ==
Algebraic combinatorics has come to be seen more expansively as an area of mathematics where the interaction of combinatorial and algebraic methods is particularly strong and significant. Thus the combinatorial topics may be enumerative in nature or involve matroids, polytopes, partially ordered sets, or finite geometries. On the algebraic side, besides group theory and representation theory, lattice theory and commutative algebra are commonly used.

== Important topics ==
=== Symmetric functions ===
The ring of symmetric functions is a specific limit of the rings of symmetric polynomials in n indeterminates, as n goes to infinity. This ring serves as universal structure in which relations between symmetric polynomials can be expressed in a way independent of the number n of indeterminates (but its elements are neither polynomials nor functions). Among other things, this ring plays an important role in the representation theory of the symmetric groups.

=== Association schemes ===
An association scheme is a collection of binary relations satisfying certain compatibility conditions. Association schemes provide a unified approach to many topics, for example combinatorial designs and coding theory. In algebra, association schemes generalize groups, and the theory of association schemes generalizes the character theory of linear representations of groups.

=== Strongly regular graphs ===
A strongly regular graph is defined as follows. Let G = (V,E) be a regular graph with v vertices and degree k. G is said to be strongly regular if there are also integers λ and μ such that:

- Every two adjacent vertices have λ common neighbours.
- Every two non-adjacent vertices have μ common neighbours.

A graph of this kind is sometimes said to be a srg(v, k, λ, μ).

Some authors exclude graphs which satisfy the definition trivially, namely those graphs which are the disjoint union of one or more equal-sized complete graphs, and their complements, the Turán graphs.

=== Young tableaux ===
A Young tableau (pl.: tableaux) is a combinatorial object useful in representation theory and Schubert calculus. It provides a convenient way to describe the group representations of the symmetric and general linear groups and to study their properties. Young tableaux were introduced by Alfred Young, a mathematician at Cambridge University, in 1900. They were then applied to the study of the symmetric group by Georg Frobenius in 1903. Their theory was further developed by many mathematicians, including Percy MacMahon, W. V. D. Hodge, G. de B. Robinson, Gian-Carlo Rota, Alain Lascoux, Marcel-Paul Schützenberger and Richard P. Stanley.

=== Matroids ===
A matroid is a structure that captures and generalizes the notion of linear independence in vector spaces. There are many equivalent ways to define a matroid, the most significant being in terms of independent sets, bases, circuits, closed sets or flats, closure operators, and rank functions.

Matroid theory borrows extensively from the terminology of linear algebra and graph theory, largely because it is the abstraction of various notions of central importance in these fields. Matroids have found applications in geometry, topology, combinatorial optimization, network theory and coding theory.

=== Finite geometries ===
A finite geometry is any geometric system that has only a finite number of points. The familiar Euclidean geometry is not finite, because a Euclidean line contains infinitely many points. A geometry based on the graphics displayed on a computer screen, where the pixels are considered to be the points, would be a finite geometry. While there are many systems that could be called finite geometries, attention is mostly paid to the finite projective and affine spaces because of their regularity and simplicity. Other significant types of finite geometry are finite Möbius or inversive planes and Laguerre planes, which are examples of a general type called Benz planes, and their higher-dimensional analogs such as higher finite inversive geometries.

Finite geometries may be constructed via linear algebra, starting from vector spaces over a finite field; the affine and projective planes so constructed are called Galois geometries. Finite geometries can also be defined purely axiomatically. Most common finite geometries are Galois geometries, since any finite projective space of dimension three or greater is isomorphic to a projective space over a finite field (that is, the projectivization of a vector space over a finite field). However, dimension two has affine and projective planes that are not isomorphic to Galois geometries, namely the non-Desarguesian planes. Similar results hold for other kinds of finite geometries.

== See also ==
- Algebraic graph theory
- Combinatorial commutative algebra
- Polyhedral combinatorics
- Algebraic Combinatorics (journal)
- Journal of Algebraic Combinatorics
- International Conference on Formal Power Series and Algebraic Combinatorics

== Works cited ==
- Bailey, Rosemary A. (2004). Association Schemes: Designed Experiments, Algebra and Combinatorics. Cambridge University Press. ISBN 978-0-521-82446-0. MR 2047311.. (Chapters from preliminary draft are available on-line Archived 30 January 2022 at the Wayback Machine.)
- Bannai, Eiichi (2012). "Algebraic Combinatorics" (PDF). School of Mathematical Sciences Shanghai Jiao Tong University.
- Bannai, Eiichi; Ito, Tatsuro (1984). Algebraic combinatorics I: Association schemes. Menlo Park, CA: The Benjamin/Cummings Publishing Co. ISBN 0-8053-0490-8. MR 0882540.
- Brouwer, Andries E.; Haemers, Willem H. (n.d.). Spectra of Graphs (PDF). p. 101. Archived from the original (PDF) on 16 March 2012.
- Godsil, Chris; Royle, Gordon (2001). Algebraic Graph Theory. Graduate Texts in Mathematics. New York: Springer-Verlag. p. 218. ISBN 978-0-387-95241-3.
- Godsil, Chris D. (1993). Algebraic Combinatorics. New York: Chapman and Hall. ISBN 0-412-04131-6. MR 1220704.
- Kashyap, Navin; Soljanin, Emina; Vontobel, Pascal (2–7 August 2009). "Applications of Matroid Theory and Combinatorial Optimization to Information and Coding Theory" (PDF). BIRS.
- Neel, David L.; Neudauer, Nancy Ann (2009). "Matroids you have known" (PDF). Mathematics Magazine. 82 (1): 26–41. doi:10.4169/193009809x469020. Archived from the original (PDF) on 13 February 2022.
- Zieschang, Paul-Hermann (2005a). "Association Schemes: Designed Experiments, Algebra and Combinatorics by Rosemary A. Bailey, Review" (PDF). Bulletin of the American Mathematical Society. 43 (2): 249–253. doi:10.1090/S0273-0979-05-01077-3.
- Zieschang, Paul-Hermann (2005b). Theory of association schemes. Springer. ISBN 3-540-26136-2.
