= Journal of Combinatorial Theory =

- Discipline: Mathematics
- Language: English

Publication details
- History: 1966-present
- Publisher: Elsevier
- Frequency: Monthly
- Open access: Hybrid
- Impact factor: 1.7 (Series A)(2025) 1.3 (Series B)(2025)

Standard abbreviations
- ISO 4: J. Comb. Theory
- MathSciNet: J. Combin. Theory

Indexing
- Series A
- ISSN: 0097-3165 (print); 1096-0899 (web)
- Series B
- ISSN: 0095-8956 (print); 1096-0902 (web)

Links
- Series A website; Series B website

The Journal of Combinatorial Theory, Series A and Series B, are mathematical journals specializing in combinatorics and related areas. They are published by Elsevier. Series A is concerned primarily with structures, designs, and applications of combinatorics. Series B is concerned primarily with graph and matroid theory. The two series are two of the leading journals in the field and are widely known as JCTA and JCTB.

The journal was founded in 1966 by Frank Harary and Gian-Carlo Rota. Originally there was only one journal, which was split into two parts in 1971 as the field grew rapidly.

In 2020, most of the editorial board of JCTA resigned to form a new, open access journal Combinatorial Theory. The new journal aims to be a continuation of JCTA independently from Elsevier. It published its first issue in December 2021.

Michel Lavrauw is the editor-in-chief of JCTA.

D. Král' and D. Mubayi are the editors-in-chief of JCTB.

== Abstracting and indexing ==
Both JCTA and JCTB are abstracted and indexed in Science Citation Index Expanded.

According to the Journal Citation Reports, JCTA has a 2025 impact factor of 1.7, ranking it 52th out of 499 journals in the category "MATHEMATICS"; JCTB has a 2025 impact factor of 1.3, ranking it 96th out of 499 journals in the category "MATHEMATICS".

== Influential articles ==
Influential articles that appeared in the journal include Katona's elegant proof of the Erdős–Ko–Rado theorem and a series of papers spanning over 500 pages, appearing from 1983 to 2004, by Neil Robertson and Paul D. Seymour on the topic of graph minors, which together constitute the proof of the graph minors theorem. Two articles proving Kneser's conjecture, the first by László Lovász and the other by Imre Bárány, appeared back-to-back in the same issue of the journal.
