= Brendan McKay (mathematician) =

Australian mathematician (born 1951)

Brendan McKay FAA
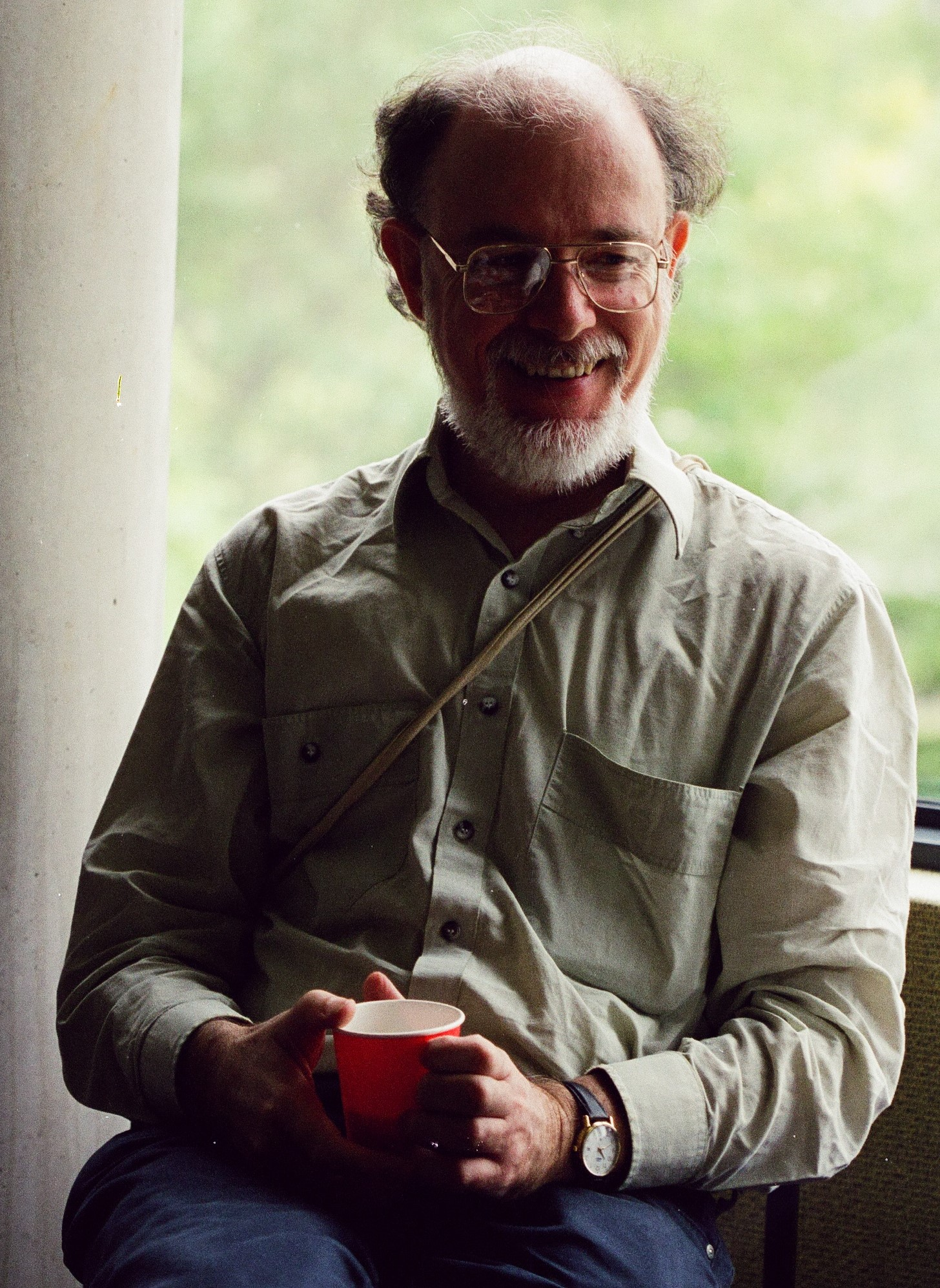
- McKay in 2000
- Born: Brendan Damien McKay; 26 October 1951 (age 74); Melbourne, Victoria, Australia
- Education: University of Melbourne
- Awards: Australian Mathematical Society Medal (1990); Fellow of the Australian Academy of Science (1997)
- Scientific career
- Fields: Combinatorics
- Workplaces: Australian National University; Vanderbilt University
- Thesis: Topics in Computational Graph Theory (1980)
- Doctoral students: Jeanette McLeod
- Website: users.cecs.anu.edu.au/~bdm/

Brendan Damien McKay (born 26 October 1951) is an Australian computer scientist and mathematician. He is currently an emeritus professor in the Research School of Computer Science at the Australian National University (ANU). He has published extensively in combinatorics.

Born in Melbourne, McKay received a Ph.D. in mathematics from the University of Melbourne in 1980, and was appointed assistant professor of computer science at Vanderbilt University in Nashville in the same year. His thesis, Topics in Computational Graph Theory, was written under the direction of Derek Holton. He was awarded the Australian Mathematical Society Medal in 1990. He was elected a Fellow of the Australian Academy of Science in 1997, and appointed professor of computer science at the ANU in 2000.

== Mathematics ==
McKay is the author of at least 127 refereed articles.

One of McKay's main contributions has been a practical algorithm for the graph isomorphism problem and its software implementation NAUTY (No AUTomorphisms, Yes?). Further achievements include proving with Stanisław Radziszowski that the Ramsey number R(4, 5) is equal to 25, proving with Radziszowski that no 4-(12, 6, 6) combinatorial designs exist, determining with Gunnar Brinkmann the number of posets on 16 points, and determining with Ian Wanless the number of Latin squares of size 11. Together with Brinkmann, he also developed the Plantri programme for generating planar triangulations and planar cubic graphs.

The McKay–Miller–Širáň graphs, a class of highly symmetric graphs with diameter two and many vertices relative to their degree, are named in part for McKay, who first wrote about them with Mirka Miller and Jozef Širáň in 1998.

== Biblical ciphers ==
Outside of his speciality, McKay is best known for leading a team, consisting of mathematicians Dror Bar-Natan and Gil Kalai and psychologist Maya Bar-Hillel, that rebutted a Bible code theory advanced by Eliyahu Rips, Yoav Rosenberg and Doron Witztum, which maintained that the Hebrew text of the Bible enciphered predictive details of future historical events. The paper in question had been accepted for publication by a peer-reviewed scientific journal in 1994. Their rebuttal, together with a paper written by an anonymous mathematician, argued that the patterns in the Bible that supposedly indicate some hidden message from a divine source or have predictive power can be just as easily found in other works, such as War and Peace. The discredited theory was taken up by US journalist Michael Drosnin. Drosnin said he was convinced of this theory when one of its exponents stated that the Torah predicted the Iraqi wars. He expressed his certainty publicly that such coded messages could not be found in any other work than the Bible, and, in an interview with Newsweek, he challenged: "When my critics find a message about the assassination of a prime minister encrypted in Moby Dick, I'll believe them."

In response, McKay employed the same Bible decryption method described by Rips' group, quickly found some nine references to Yitzhak Rabin's assassination in Herman Melville's masterpiece. He also showed that the same technique allowed him to find ostensible mentions not only of the assassinations of Martin Luther King, JFK, and Abraham Lincoln but also references to Diana, Princess of Wales, her lover Dodi Fayed, and their chauffeur Henri Paul in the same novel.

This debunking disproof of a theory that the Bible encrypts secret messages containing future world history achieved international attention for McKay outside of his specific field of combinatorics.

== Azzam Pasha quotation ==
McKay also uncovered the original source of the Azzam Pasha quotation. The original source, an 11 October 1947 article in the Egyptian newspaper Akhbar al-Yom, was first referenced in an article by David Barnett and Efraim Karsh in the Fall 2011 issue of Middle East Quarterly without reference to McKay. Tom Segev responded in an op-ed in Haaretz that McKay had in fact been the original source of the material and had uploaded it to Wikipedia. McKay had notified the Wikipedia talk page of having found the original interview from which the quote was taken and later provided it to Barnett. According to Karsh, McKay was offered a co-author credit in the Middle East Quarterly article but he declined on the grounds of having a low opinion of the publication.

== Further ==
He gave an invited talk at the International Congress of Mathematicians in 2010, on the topic of "Combinatorics".
