= Rodica Simion =

Romanian-American mathematician

Rodica Eugenia Simion (January 18, 1955 – January 7, 2000) was a Romanian-American mathematician. She was the Columbian School Professor of Mathematics at George Washington University. Her research concerned combinatorics: she was a pioneer in the study of permutation patterns, and an expert on noncrossing partitions.

== Biography ==
Simion was one of the top competitors in the Romanian national mathematical olympiads. She graduated from the University of Bucharest in 1974, and immigrated to the United States in 1976. She did her graduate studies at the University of Pennsylvania, earning a Ph.D. in 1981 under the supervision of Herbert Wilf. After teaching at Southern Illinois University and Bryn Mawr College, she moved to George Washington University in 1987, and became Columbian School Professor in 1997.

== Recognition ==
She is included in a deck of playing cards featuring notable women mathematicians published by the Association of Women in Mathematics.

== Research contributions ==
Simion's thesis research concerned the concavity and unimodality of certain combinatorially defined sequences, and included what Richard P. Stanley calls "a very influential result" that the zeros of certain polynomials are all real.

Next, with Frank Schmidt, she was one of the first to study the combinatorics of sets of permutations defined by forbidden patterns; she found a bijective proof that the stack-sortable permutations and the permutations formed by interleaving two monotonic sequences are equinumerous, and found combinatorial enumerations of many permutation classes. The "simsun permutations" were named after her and Sheila Sundaram, after their initial studies of these objects; a simsun permutation is a permutation in which, for all k, the subsequence of the smallest k elements has no three consecutive elements in decreasing order.

Simion also did extensive research on noncrossing partitions, and became "perhaps the world's leading authority" on them.

== Other activities ==
Simion was the main organizer of an exhibit about mathematics, Beyond Numbers, at the Maryland Science Center, based in part on her earlier experience organizing a similar exhibit at George Washington University. She was also a leader in George Washington University's annual Summer Program for Women in Mathematics. As well as being a mathematician, Simion was a poet and painter; her poem "Immigrant Complex" was published in a collection of mathematical poetry in 1979.

== Selected publications ==
- Simion, Rodica (1984), "A multi-indexed Sturm sequence of polynomials and unimodality of certain combinatorial sequences", Journal of Combinatorial Theory, Series A, 36 (1): 15–22, doi:10.1016/0097-3165(84)90075-X, MR 0728500.
- Simion, Rodica; Schmidt, Frank W. (1985), "Restricted permutations", European Journal of Combinatorics, 6 (4): 383–406, doi:10.1016/s0195-6698(85)80052-4, MR 0829358.
- Simion, Rodica; Ullman, Daniel (1991), "On the structure of the lattice of noncrossing partitions", Discrete Mathematics, 98 (3): 193–206, doi:10.1016/0012-365X(91)90376-D, MR 1144402.
- Simion, Rodica (2000), "Noncrossing partitions", Discrete Mathematics, 217 (1–3): 367–409, doi:10.1016/S0012-365X(99)00273-3, MR 1766277.

== See also ==
- Cyclohedron
