= Martin Klazar =

Czech mathematician (born 1966)

- Born: 1966 (age 59–60); Děčín, Czechoslovakia
- Education: Charles University (RNDr., Ph.D., 1995)
- Known for: Davenport–Schinzel sequences; Permutation patterns
- Scientific career
- Fields: Combinatorics
- Workplaces: Charles University
- Doctoral advisor: Jaroslav Nešetřil

Martin Klazar (born 1966) is a Czech mathematician specializing in enumerative combinatorics and extremal combinatorics. He is a docent (associate professor) in the Department of Applied Mathematics at Charles University in Prague. Klazar is known for his work on pattern avoidance in discrete structures (such as permutations and set partitions) and on extremal problems for sequences and matrices.

== Education and career ==
Klazar was born in Děčín, Czechoslovakia (now the Czech Republic) in 1966. He studied mathematics at the Charles University in Prague from 1984 to 1989, earning the degree of RNDr. (Rerum Naturalium Doctor). He received his Ph.D. from Charles University in 1995 under the supervision of Jaroslav Nešetřil, with a dissertation on combinatorial aspects of Davenport–Schinzel sequences. In 1997–98, Klazar was awarded a Humboldt Research Fellowship to conduct research at the University of Bonn in Germany under host Bernhard Korte. He later habilitated at Charles University, where he became a docent (associate professor) in the Department of Applied Mathematics.

== Research ==
Klazar's research deals with problems in enumerative combinatorics, permutation patterns, and extremal combinatorics.

In a 1992 paper, he proved a general upper bound in the extremal theory of sequences, showing that the maximum length of sequences over an n-letter alphabet in which any two occurrences of the same letter are separated by at least k-1 other letters, and which avoid a fixed forbidden subsequence $u$ of length $|u|>4$ over a k-letter alphabet is almost linear in n (more precisely, it is $O(n2^{O(\alpha(n)^{|u|-4})})$, where $\alpha(n)$ denotes the inverse Ackermann function and $|u|$ is the length of $u$).

His 1996 paper "On $abab$-free and $abba$-free set partitions" is credited as initiating the study of pattern-avoiding set partitions (analogous to pattern avoidance in permutations), generalizing Germain Kreweras's notion of noncrossing partitions. That work found connections to Davenport–Schinzel sequences and provided exact formulas for the number of set partitions avoiding certain 4-element patterns. Klazar later continued his investigations of pattern-avoiding set partitions in other works.

In 2000, Klazar showed that the long-standing Stanley–Wilf conjecture on permutation patterns would follow from an extremal conjecture of Zoltán Füredi and Péter Hajnal concerning forbidden submatrices. This approach foreshadowed the subsequent 2004 proof of the Stanley–Wilf conjecture by Adam Marcus and Gábor Tardos, for which Marcus was awarded the inaugural Dénes König Prize in 2008.

Klazar's joint 2002 paper with Tomáš Kaiser, "On growth rates of closed permutation classes" was the first research to systemically consider the set of possible growth rates of permutation classes. Their paper characterized all accumulation points of growth constants below 2, showing in particular that 2 is the least accumulation point of permutation class growth rates, and that there are no such growth rates between 1 and the golden ratio.
