= Lovász =

Lovász (Hungarian pronunciation: [ˈlovaːs]):

- Chris Lovasz (born 1980), Canadian-British content creator
- Gyöngyi Lovász (born 1959), Hungarian retired footballer
- Irén Lovász (born 1961), Hungarian folk singer and ethnographer
- Lázár Lovász (1942–2023), Hungarian athlete who competed in hammer throw
- László Lovász (born 1948), Hungarian mathematician best known for his work in combinatorics
  - Lovász conjecture (1970)
  - Erdős–Faber–Lovász conjecture (1972)
  - The Lovász local lemma (proved in 1975, by László Lovász & P. Erdős)
  - The Lenstra–Lenstra–Lovász lattice basis reduction (algorithm) (LLL)
  - Algorithmic Lovász local lemma (proved in 2009, by Robin Moser and Gábor Tardos)
  - Lovász number (1979)
- Zsuzsanna Lovász (born 1976), Hungarian retired handball player
