= Sorting number =

Worst-case number of comparisons used by sorting algorithms

In mathematics and computer science, the sorting numbers are a sequence of numbers introduced in 1950 by Hugo Steinhaus for the analysis of comparison sort algorithms. These numbers give the worst-case number of comparisons used by both binary insertion sort and merge sort. However, there are other algorithms that use fewer comparisons.

== Formula and examples ==
The $n$th sorting number is given by the formula

$\displaystyle n\lceil\log_2 n\rceil - 2^{\lceil\log_2 n\rceil} + 1.$

The sequence of numbers given by this formula (starting with $n = 1$) is

0, 1, 3, 5, 8, 11, 14, 17, 21, 25, 29, 33, 37, 41, ... (sequence A001855 in the OEIS).

The same sequence of numbers can also be obtained from the recurrence relation,

$$A(n) = A\bigl(\lfloor n/2\rfloor\bigr) + A\bigl(\lceil n/2\rceil\bigr) + n - 1$$.

It is an example of a 2-regular sequence.

Asymptotically, the value of the $n$th sorting number fluctuates between approximately $n\log_2 n - n$ and $n\log_2 n - 0.915n,$ depending on the ratio between $n$ and the nearest power of two.

== Application to sorting ==
In 1950, Hugo Steinhaus observed that these numbers count the number of comparisons used by binary insertion sort, and conjectured (incorrectly) that they give the minimum number of comparisons needed to sort $n$ items using any comparison sort. The conjecture was disproved in 1959 by L. R. Ford Jr. and Selmer M. Johnson, who found a different sorting algorithm, the Ford–Johnson merge-insertion sort, using fewer comparisons.

The same sequence of sorting numbers also gives the worst-case number of comparisons used by merge sort to sort $n$ items.

== Other applications ==
The sorting numbers (shifted by one position) also give the sizes of the shortest possible superpatterns for the layered permutations.
