= Steingrímsson =

Steingrímsson is an Icelandic patronym, meaning son of Steingrímur. Notable people with the surname include:

- Einar Steingrímsson (born 1955), Icelandic mathematician
- Guðmundur Steingrímsson (born 1972), Icelandic politician
- Héðinn Steingrímsson (born 1975), Icelandic chess grandmaster
