= Enumerations of specific permutation classes =

In the study of permutation patterns, there has been considerable interest in enumerating specific permutation classes, especially those with relatively few basis elements. This area of study has turned up unexpected instances of Wilf equivalence, where two seemingly-unrelated permutation classes have the same number of permutations of each length.

== Classes avoiding one pattern of length 3 ==
There are two symmetry classes and a single Wilf class for single permutations of length three.

β	sequence enumerating Av_{n}(β)	OEIS	type of sequence	exact enumeration reference
123; 231	1, 2, 5, 14, 42, 132, 429, 1430, ...	A000108	algebraic (nonrational) g.f. Catalan numbers	MacMahon (1916); Knuth (1968)

== Classes avoiding one pattern of length 4 ==
There are seven symmetry classes and three Wilf classes for single permutations of length four.

β	sequence enumerating Av_{n}(β)	OEIS	type of sequence	exact enumeration reference
1342; 2413	1, 2, 6, 23, 103, 512, 2740, 15485, ...	A022558	algebraic (nonrational) g.f.	Bóna (1997)
1234; 1243; 1432; 2143	1, 2, 6, 23, 103, 513, 2761, 15767, ...	A005802	holonomic (nonalgebraic) g.f.	Gessel (1990)
1324	1, 2, 6, 23, 103, 513, 2762, 15793, ...	A061552		

No non-recursive formula counting 1324-avoiding permutations is known. A recursive formula was given by Marinov & Radoičić (2003). A more efficient algorithm using functional equations was given by Johansson & Nakamura (2014), which was enhanced by Conway & Guttmann (2015), and then further enhanced by Conway, Guttmann & Zinn-Justin (2018) who give the first 50 terms of the enumeration. Bevan et al. (2020) currently have the best rigorously established lower and upper bounds for the growth rate of this class, having established that this growth rate lies in the interval [10.271, 13.5].

== Classes avoiding two patterns of length 3 ==
There are five symmetry classes and three Wilf classes, all of which were enumerated in Simion & Schmidt (1985).

B	sequence enumerating Av_{n}(B)	OEIS	type of sequence
123, 321	1, 2, 4, 4, 0, 0, 0, 0, ...	n/a	finite
213, 321	1, 2, 4, 7, 11, 16, 22, 29, ...	A000124	polynomial, ${n\choose 2}+1$
231, 321; 132, 312; 231, 312	1, 2, 4, 8, 16, 32, 64, 128, ...	A000079	rational g.f., $2^{n-1}$

== Classes avoiding one pattern of length 3 and one of length 4 ==
There are eighteen symmetry classes and nine Wilf classes, all of which have been enumerated. For these results, see Atkinson (1999) or West (1996).

B	sequence enumerating Av_{n}(B)	OEIS	type of sequence
321, 1234	1, 2, 5, 13, 25, 25, 0, 0, ...	n/a	finite
321, 2134	1, 2, 5, 13, 30, 61, 112, 190, ...	A116699	polynomial
132, 4321	1, 2, 5, 13, 31, 66, 127, 225, ...	A116701	polynomial
321, 1324	1, 2, 5, 13, 32, 72, 148, 281, ...	A179257	polynomial
321, 1342	1, 2, 5, 13, 32, 74, 163, 347, ...	A116702	rational g.f.
321, 2143	1, 2, 5, 13, 33, 80, 185, 411, ...	A088921	rational g.f.
132, 4312; 132, 4231	1, 2, 5, 13, 33, 81, 193, 449, ...	A005183	rational g.f.
132, 3214	1, 2, 5, 13, 33, 82, 202, 497, ...	A116703	rational g.f.
321, 2341; 321, 3412; 321, 3142; 132, 1234; 132, 4213; 132, 4123; 132, 3124; 132, 2134; 132, 3412	1, 2, 5, 13, 34, 89, 233, 610, ...	A001519	rational g.f., alternate Fibonacci numbers

== Classes avoiding two patterns of length 4 ==
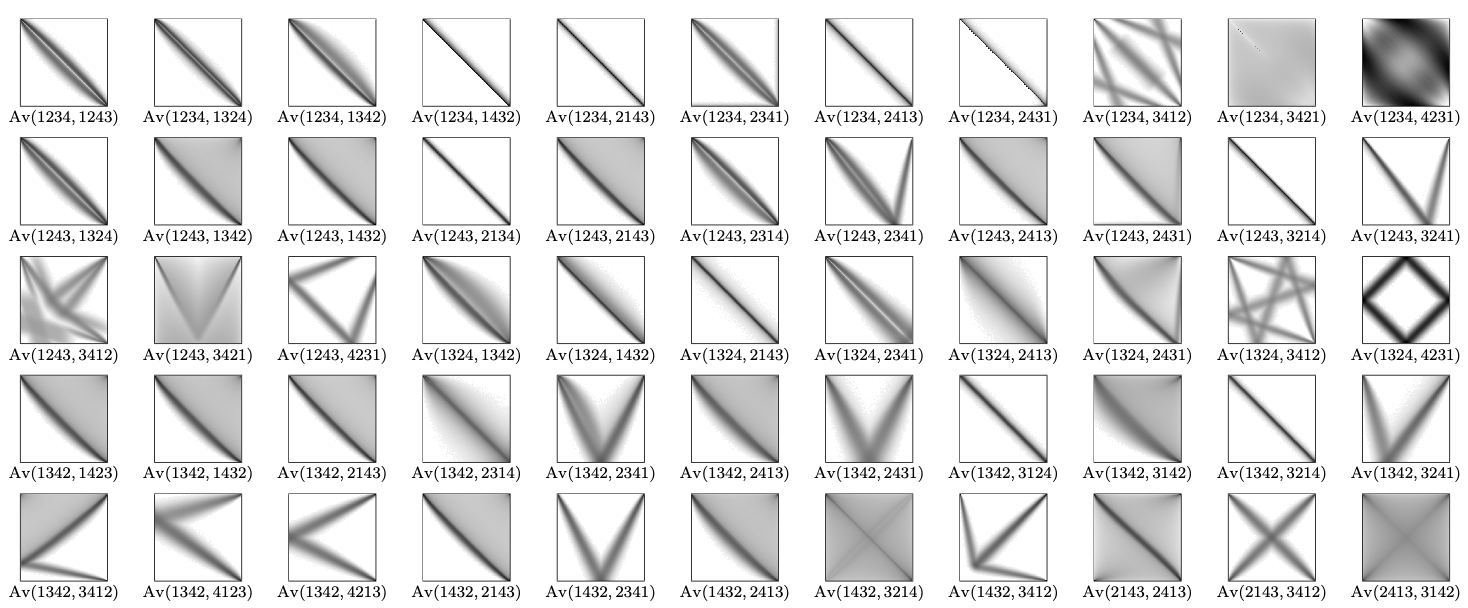
Heatmaps of classes avoiding two patterns of length 4.

There are 56 symmetry classes and 38 Wilf equivalence classes. Only 3 of these remain unenumerated, and their generating functions are conjectured not to satisfy any algebraic differential equation (ADE) by Albert et al. (2018); in particular, their conjecture would imply that these generating functions are not D-finite.

Heatmaps of each of the non-finite classes are shown on the right, from Albert et al. (2024). The lexicographically minimal symmetry is used for each class, and the classes are ordered in lexicographical order. To create each heatmap, one million permutations of length 300 were sampled uniformly at random from the class. The color of the point $(i,j)$ represents how many permutations have value $j$ at index $i$. Higher resolution versions can be obtained at PermPal

B	sequence enumerating Av_{n}(B)	OEIS	type of sequence	exact enumeration reference
4321, 1234	1, 2, 6, 22, 86, 306, 882, 1764, ...	A206736	finite	Erdős–Szekeres theorem
4312, 1234	1, 2, 6, 22, 86, 321, 1085, 3266, ...	A116705	polynomial	Kremer & Shiu (2003); Vatter (2006)
4321, 3124	1, 2, 6, 22, 86, 330, 1198, 4087, ...	A116708	rational g.f.	Kremer & Shiu (2003); Vatter (2006)
4312, 2134	1, 2, 6, 22, 86, 330, 1206, 4174, ...	A116706	rational g.f.	Kremer & Shiu (2003); Vatter (2006)
4321, 1324	1, 2, 6, 22, 86, 332, 1217, 4140, ...	A165524	polynomial	Vatter (2012)
4321, 2143	1, 2, 6, 22, 86, 333, 1235, 4339, ...	A165525	rational g.f.	Albert, Atkinson & Brignall (2012)
4312, 1324	1, 2, 6, 22, 86, 335, 1266, 4598, ...	A165526	rational g.f.	Albert, Atkinson & Brignall (2012)
4231, 2143	1, 2, 6, 22, 86, 335, 1271, 4680, ...	A165527	rational g.f.	Albert, Atkinson & Brignall (2011)
4231, 1324	1, 2, 6, 22, 86, 336, 1282, 4758, ...	A165528	rational g.f.	Albert, Atkinson & Vatter (2009)
4213, 2341	1, 2, 6, 22, 86, 336, 1290, 4870, ...	A116709	rational g.f.	Kremer & Shiu (2003); Vatter (2006)
4312, 2143	1, 2, 6, 22, 86, 337, 1295, 4854, ...	A165529	rational g.f.	Albert, Atkinson & Brignall (2012)
4213, 1243	1, 2, 6, 22, 86, 337, 1299, 4910, ...	A116710	rational g.f.	Kremer & Shiu (2003); Vatter (2006)
4321, 3142	1, 2, 6, 22, 86, 338, 1314, 5046, ...	A165530	rational g.f.	Vatter (2012)
4213, 1342	1, 2, 6, 22, 86, 338, 1318, 5106, ...	A116707	rational g.f.	Kremer & Shiu (2003); Vatter (2006)
4312, 2341	1, 2, 6, 22, 86, 338, 1318, 5110, ...	A116704	rational g.f.	Kremer & Shiu (2003); Vatter (2006)
3412, 2143	1, 2, 6, 22, 86, 340, 1340, 5254, ...	A029759	algebraic (nonrational) g.f.	Atkinson (1998)
4321, 4123; 4321, 3412; 4123, 3214; 4123, 2143	1, 2, 6, 22, 86, 342, 1366, 5462, ...	A047849	rational g.f.	Kremer & Shiu (2003)
4123, 2341	1, 2, 6, 22, 87, 348, 1374, 5335, ...	A165531	algebraic (nonrational) g.f.	Atkinson, Sagan & Vatter (2012)
4231, 3214	1, 2, 6, 22, 87, 352, 1428, 5768, ...	A165532	algebraic (nonrational) g.f.	Miner (2016)
4213, 1432	1, 2, 6, 22, 87, 352, 1434, 5861, ...	A165533	algebraic (nonrational) g.f.	Miner (2016)
4312, 3421; 4213, 2431	1, 2, 6, 22, 87, 354, 1459, 6056, ...	A164651	algebraic (nonrational) g.f.	Le (2005) proved the Wilf-equivalence; Callan (2013a) established the g.f..
4312, 3124	1, 2, 6, 22, 88, 363, 1507, 6241, ...	A165534	algebraic (nonrational) g.f.	Pantone (2017)
4231, 3124	1, 2, 6, 22, 88, 363, 1508, 6255, ...	A165535	algebraic (nonrational) g.f.	Albert, Atkinson & Vatter (2014)
4312, 3214	1, 2, 6, 22, 88, 365, 1540, 6568, ...	A165536	algebraic (nonrational) g.f.	Miner (2016)
4231, 3412; 4231, 3142; 4213, 3241; 4213, 3124; 4213, 2314	1, 2, 6, 22, 88, 366, 1552, 6652, ...	A032351	algebraic (nonrational) g.f.	Bóna (1998)
4213, 2143	1, 2, 6, 22, 88, 366, 1556, 6720, ...	A165537	algebraic (nonrational) g.f.	Bevan (2016b)
4312, 3142	1, 2, 6, 22, 88, 367, 1568, 6810, ...	A165538	algebraic (nonrational) g.f.	Albert, Atkinson & Vatter (2014)
4213, 3421	1, 2, 6, 22, 88, 367, 1571, 6861, ...	A165539	algebraic (nonrational) g.f.	Bevan (2016a)
4213, 3412; 4123, 3142	1, 2, 6, 22, 88, 368, 1584, 6968, ...	A109033	algebraic (nonrational) g.f.	Le (2005)
4321, 3214	1, 2, 6, 22, 89, 376, 1611, 6901, ...	A165540	algebraic (nonrational) g.f.	Bevan (2016a)
4213, 3142	1, 2, 6, 22, 89, 379, 1664, 7460, ...	A165541	algebraic (nonrational) g.f.	Albert, Atkinson & Vatter (2014)
4231, 4123	1, 2, 6, 22, 89, 380, 1677, 7566, ...	A165542	conjectured to not satisfy any ADE; see Albert et al. (2018)	
4321, 4213	1, 2, 6, 22, 89, 380, 1678, 7584, ...	A165543	algebraic (nonrational) g.f.	Callan (2013b); see also Bloom & Vatter (2016)
4123, 3412	1, 2, 6, 22, 89, 381, 1696, 7781, ...	A165544	algebraic (nonrational) g.f.	Miner & Pantone (2018)
4312, 4123	1, 2, 6, 22, 89, 382, 1711, 7922, ...	A165545	conjectured to not satisfy any ADE; see Albert et al. (2018)	
4321, 4312; 4312, 4231; 4312, 4213; 4312, 3412; 4231, 4213; 4213, 4132; 4213, 4123; 4213, 2413; 4213, 3214; 3142, 2413	1, 2, 6, 22, 90, 394, 1806, 8558, ...	A006318	Schröder numbers algebraic (nonrational) g.f.	Kremer (2000); see also Kremer (2003)
3412, 2413	1, 2, 6, 22, 90, 395, 1823, 8741, ...	A165546	algebraic (nonrational) g.f.	Miner & Pantone (2018)
4321, 4231	1, 2, 6, 22, 90, 396, 1837, 8864, ...	A053617	conjectured to not satisfy any ADE; see Albert et al. (2018)	

== See also ==
- Baxter permutation
- Riffle shuffle permutation
