= Einar Steingrímsson =

Icelandic mathematician

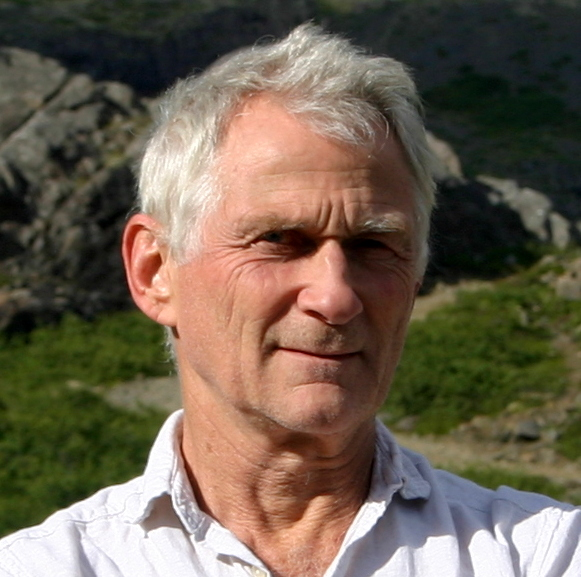
- Einar Steingrímsson in August 2017
- Born: 20 July 1955 (age 71); Reykjavík, Iceland
- Education: University of Pennsylvania (BA and MA, 1987); Massachusetts Institute of Technology (PhD, 1992)
- Known for: Permutation patterns; Mahonian statistics; Vincular patterns
- Scientific career
- Fields: Combinatorics
- Workplaces: Chalmers University of Technology; Reykjavik University; University of Strathclyde
- Doctoral advisor: Richard P. Stanley
- Doctoral students: Sergey Kitaev

Einar Steingrímsson (born 20 July 1955) is an Icelandic mathematician whose research lies in enumerative combinatorics, especially the study of permutation patterns and permutation statistics. He is a research professor (emeritus) in the School of Mathematics and Statistics at the University of Strathclyde.

== Early life and education ==
Einar grew up in Reykjavík and left secondary school early at age eighteen (the normal graduation age at the time was twenty), and trained as a ship builder at Slippstöðin in Akureyri. After completing qualifying examinations independently, he enrolled at the University of Pennsylvania. He graduated there as a BA and MA in mathematics in 1987, and as PhD at the Massachusetts Institute of Technology in 1992 under the supervision of Richard P. Stanley; his dissertation was titled Permutation Statistics of Indexed and Poset Permutations.

== Career ==
Einar moved to Gothenburg, Sweden, in 1990, while still a graduate student at the Massachusetts Institute of Technology, and, in 1992, Einar was hired at Chalmers University of Technology as part of the joint mathematics institute with the University of Gothenburg. In 2004 he became a professor of mathematics at Reykjavik University. From 2010 to 2021 he was a professor at the University of Strathclyde in Glasgow, Scotland.

== Research ==
Einar's research focuses on permutation statistics, pattern avoidance, and related enumerative problems.

- In a 1994 paper, he studied permutation statistics defined on colored permutations (then called indexed permutations), relating them to classical statistics such as descents and inversions.
- In a 2000 paper joint with Eric Babson, he introduced vincular permutation patterns (then called "generalized patterns"); that paper also classified Mahonian statistics expressible via these patterns.
- New Euler–Mahonian bi-statistics on permutations and words were described in a joint work with R. J. Clarke and Jiang Zeng, extending earlier Eulerian–Mahonian results.
- Connections between permutation tableaux and pattern avoidance were examined in his joint work with Lauren K. Williams, linking tableaux combinatorics to steady-state distributions in the asymmetric simple exclusion process.
- His joint work with Anders Claesson and Vít Jelínek established that the growth rate of the class of 1324-avoiding permutations is at most 16, and presented a still-open conjecture that if true would lower this bound to $e^{\pi\sqrt{2/3}}$, approximately 13.00195.
