= Bridget Tenner =

American mathematician

Bridget Eileen Tenner is a professor of mathematics at DePaul University in Chicago. Her research focuses on permutation patterns, and has also included work in algebraic combinatorics, discrete geometry, Coxeter groups, and electoral geography.

== Education and career ==
Tenner majored in mathematics at Harvard University, graduating magna cum laude in 2002. She completed a Ph.D. at the Massachusetts Institute of Technology (MIT) in 2006. Her doctoral dissertation, The Combinatorics of Reduced Decompositions, was supervised by Richard P. Stanley; as a doctoral student she also visited Microsoft Research, and the Mittag-Leffler Institute in Sweden.

She continued at MIT as a postdoctoral researcher until 2007, when she became an assistant professor at DePaul University. She was promoted to associate professor in 2011 and full professor in 2017.

== Recognition ==
Tenner was elected as a Fellow of the American Mathematical Society, in the 2025 class of fellows.
