= Jeffrey B. Remmel =

American mathematician (1948–2017)

- Born: October 12, 1948; Clintonville, Wisconsin
- Died: September 2, 2017 (aged 68); La Jolla, California
- Title: Distinguished Professor of Mathematics

Academic background
- Education: Swarthmore College (BA); Cornell University (MS, PhD)
- Thesis: Co-recursively Enumerable Structures (1974)
- Doctoral advisor: Anil Nerode

Academic work
- Discipline: Mathematician
- Sub-discipline: Combinatorics; logic; mathematical logic; computer science; computability
- Institutions: UC San Diego

Jeffrey Brian Remmel (October 12, 1948 – September 29, 2017) was an American mathematician employed by the University of California, San Diego. At the time of his death he held a distinguished professorship—his title was Distinguished Professor of Mathematics; he also held a position as a professor of computer science.

== Personal life ==
Remmel was born on October 12, 1948, in Clintonville, Wisconsin. He died aged 68 at Scripps Memorial Hospital in La Jolla, California on September 29, 2017, with a reported cause of death being a heart attack.

== Education ==
Remmel received a Bachelor of Arts degree in mathematics from Swarthmore College in 1970. Later, he received two degrees from Cornell University—a Master of Science in mathematics and a Doctor of Philosophy, also in math (1972 and 1974, respectively). At Cornell, he was advised by Anil Nerode, and his dissertation was entitled Co-recursively Enumerable Structures.

== Career ==
After obtaining his Ph.D., (Note: One source attests that he had not officially completed his Ph.D. upon joining UC San Diego.) though before he had published a single paper, Remmel joined the faculty of the University of California, San Diego as an assistant professor, where he worked for his entire career. Remmel was noted for his successful publication record in two separate fields—logic, in which he published in mathematical logic; and combinatorics, where he published papers on algebraic combinatorics. He published over 20 papers in logic with Victor W. Marek, and Remmel's more prominent career in combinatorics included over 20 co-authored papers with Sergey Kitaev. A double issue of the Journal of Combinatorics (Note: ISSN 2156-3527; ISSN 2150-959X.) was published in his memory.

Remmel's work is highly cited in the fields of vector spaces, including computably enumerable sets and vector spaces. (Note: See, for example: Kalantari, Iraj (1978). "Major Subspaces of Recursively Enumerable Vector Spaces". The Journal of Symbolic Logic. 43 (2): 293–303. doi:10.2307/2272828. ISSN 0022-4812. JSTOR 2272828.; Downey, Rod G.; Stob, M. (1986). "Structural interactions of the recursively enumerable T- and W-degrees". Annals of Pure and Applied Logic. 31: 205–236. doi:10.1016/0168-0072(86)90071-0.; Dimitrov, Rumen D.; Harizanov, Valentina (2017). "The Lattice of Computably Enumerable Vector Spaces" (PDF). In Day, Adam; Fellows, Michael; Greenberg, Noam; Khoussainov, Bakhadyr (eds.). Computability and Complexity. Vol. 10010. Cham: Springer International Publishing. pp. 366–393. doi:10.1007/978-3-319-50062-1_23. ISBN 978-3-319-50061-4.)
