= Karen L. Collins =

American mathematician

Karen Linda Collins is an American mathematician at Wesleyan University, where she is the Edward Burr Van Vleck Professor of Mathematics, Chair of Mathematics and Computer Science, and Professor of Integrative Sciences. The main topics in her research are combinatorics and graph theory.

Collins graduated from Smith College in 1981, and completed her Ph.D. in 1986 at the Massachusetts Institute of Technology. Her dissertation, Distance Matrices of Graphs, was supervised by Richard P. Stanley. In the same year, she joined the Wesleyan faculty.

She was given the Edward Burr Van Vleck Professorship in 2017.
