= Merge-insertion sort =

Type of comparison sorting algorithm

In computer science, merge-insertion sort or the Ford–Johnson algorithm is a comparison sorting algorithm published in 1959 by L. R. Ford Jr. and Selmer M. Johnson. It uses fewer comparisons in the worst case than the best previously known algorithms, binary insertion sort and merge sort, and for 20 years it was the sorting algorithm with the fewest known comparisons. Although not of practical significance, it remains of theoretical interest in connection with the problem of sorting with a minimum number of comparisons. The same algorithm may have also been independently discovered by Stanisław Trybuła and Czen Ping.

An animation of the merge-algorithm sorting an array of randomized values.

== Algorithm ==
Merge-insertion sort performs the following steps, on an input $X$ of $n$ elements:

1. Group the elements of $X$ into $\lfloor n/2\rfloor$ pairs of elements, arbitrarily, leaving one element unpaired if there is an odd number of elements.
2. Perform $\lfloor n/2\rfloor$ comparisons, one per pair, to determine the larger of the two elements in each pair.
3. Recursively sort the $\lfloor n/2\rfloor$ larger elements from each pair, creating a sorted sequence $S$ of $\lfloor n/2\rfloor$ of the input elements, in ascending order, using the merge-insertion sort.
4. Insert at the start of $S$ the element that was paired with the first and smallest element of $S$.
5. Insert the remaining $\lceil n/2\rceil-1$ elements of $X\setminus S$ into $S$, one at a time, with a specially chosen insertion ordering described below. Use binary search in subsequences of $S$ (as described below) to determine the position at which each element should be inserted.

The algorithm is designed to take advantage of the fact that the binary searches used to insert elements into $S$ are most efficient (from the point of view of worst case analysis) when the length of the subsequence that is searched is one less than a power of two. This is because, for those lengths, all outcomes of the search use the same number of comparisons as each other. To choose an insertion ordering that produces these lengths, consider the sorted sequence $S$ after step 4 of the outline above (before inserting the remaining elements), and let $x_i$ denote the $i$th element of this sorted sequence. Thus,

$$S=(x_1,x_2,x_3,\dots),$$

where each element $x_i$ with $i\ge 3$ is paired with an element $y_i < x_i$ that has not yet been inserted. (There are no elements $y_1$ or $y_2$ because $x_1$ and $x_2$ were paired with each other.) If $n$ is odd, the remaining unpaired element should also be numbered as $y_i$ with $i$ larger than the indexes of the paired elements. Then, the final step of the outline above can be expanded into the following steps:

- Partition the uninserted elements $y_i$ into groups with contiguous indexes. There are two elements $y_3$ and $y_4$ in the first group, and the sums of sizes of every two adjacent groups form a sequence of powers of two. Thus, the sizes of groups are: 2, 2, 6, 10, 22, 42, ...
- Order the uninserted elements by their groups (smaller indexes to larger indexes), but within each group order them from larger indexes to smaller indexes. Thus, the ordering becomes

$$y_4,y_3,y_6,y_5,y_{12},y_{11},y_{10},y_9,y_8,y_7,y_{22},y_{21}\dots$$

- Use this ordering to insert the elements $y_i$ into $S$. For each element $y_i$, use a binary search from the start of $S$ up to but not including $x_i$ to determine where to insert $y_i$.

== Analysis ==
Let $C(n)$ denote the number of comparisons that merge-insertion sort makes, in the worst case, when sorting $n$ elements. This number of comparisons can be broken down as the sum of three terms:

- $\lfloor n/2\rfloor$ comparisons among the pairs of items,
- $C(\lfloor n/2\rfloor)$ comparisons for the recursive call, and
- some number of comparisons for the binary insertions used to insert the remaining elements.

In the third term, the worst-case number of comparisons for the elements in the first group is two, because each is inserted into a subsequence of $S$ of length at most three. First, $y_4$ is inserted into the three-element subsequence $(x_1,x_2,x_3)$. Then, $y_3$ is inserted into some permutation of the three-element subsequence $(x_1,x_2,y_4)$, or in some cases into the two-element subsequence $(x_1,x_2)$. Similarly, the elements $y_6$ and $y_5$ of the second group are each inserted into a subsequence of length at most seven, using three comparisons. More generally, the worst-case number of comparisons for the elements in the $i$th group is $i+1$, because each is inserted into a subsequence of length at most $2^{i+1}-1$. By summing the number of comparisons used for all the elements and solving the resulting recurrence relation, this analysis can be used to compute the values of $C(n)$, giving the formula

$$C(n)=\sum_{i=1}^n \left\lceil \log_2 \frac{3i}{4} \right\rceil \approx n\log_2 n - 1.415n$$

or, in closed form,

$$C(n)=n\biggl\lceil\log_2\frac{3n}{4}\biggr\rceil-\biggl\lfloor\frac{2^{\lfloor \log_2 6n\rfloor}}{3}\biggr\rfloor+\biggl\lfloor\frac{\log_2 6n}{2}\biggr\rfloor.$$

For $n=1,2,\dots$ the numbers of comparisons are

0, 1, 3, 5, 7, 10, 13, 16, 19, 22, 26, 30, 34, ... (sequence A001768 in the OEIS)

== Relation to other comparison sorts ==
The algorithm is called merge-insertion sort because the initial comparisons that it performs before its recursive call (pairing up arbitrary items and comparing each pair) are the same as the initial comparisons of merge sort, while the comparisons that it performs after the recursive call (using binary search to insert elements one by one into a sorted list) follow the same principle as insertion sort. In this sense, it is a hybrid algorithm that combines both merge sort and insertion sort.

For small inputs (up to $n=11$) its numbers of comparisons equal the lower bound on comparison sorting of $\lceil\log_2 n!\rceil\approx n\log_2 n - 1.443n$. However, for larger inputs the number of comparisons made by the merge-insertion algorithm is bigger than this lower bound. Merge-insertion sort also performs fewer comparisons than the sorting numbers, which count the comparisons made by binary insertion sort or merge sort in the worst case. The sorting numbers fluctuate between $n\log_2 n - 0.915n$ and $n\log_2 n - n$, with the same leading term but a worse constant factor in the lower-order linear term.

Merge-insertion sort is the sorting algorithm with the minimum possible comparisons for $n$ items whenever $n\le 22$. For 20 years, merge-insertion sort was the sorting algorithm with the fewest comparisons known for all input lengths. However, in 1979 Glenn Manacher published another sorting algorithm that used even fewer comparisons, for large enough inputs. In 2026, H. G. Sager showed that it is possible to sort inputs of 26–32 elements and 46–64 elements using one fewer comparison than Ford–Johnson in the worst case. As such, the only input sizes below 26 for which the optimality of merge-insertion sort remains open are currently 23, 24, and 25. It remains unknown exactly how many comparisons are needed for sorting, for all $n$, but Manacher's algorithm and later record-breaking sorting algorithms have all used modifications of the merge-insertion sort ideas.
