= Sergey Kitaev =

Russian-British mathematician

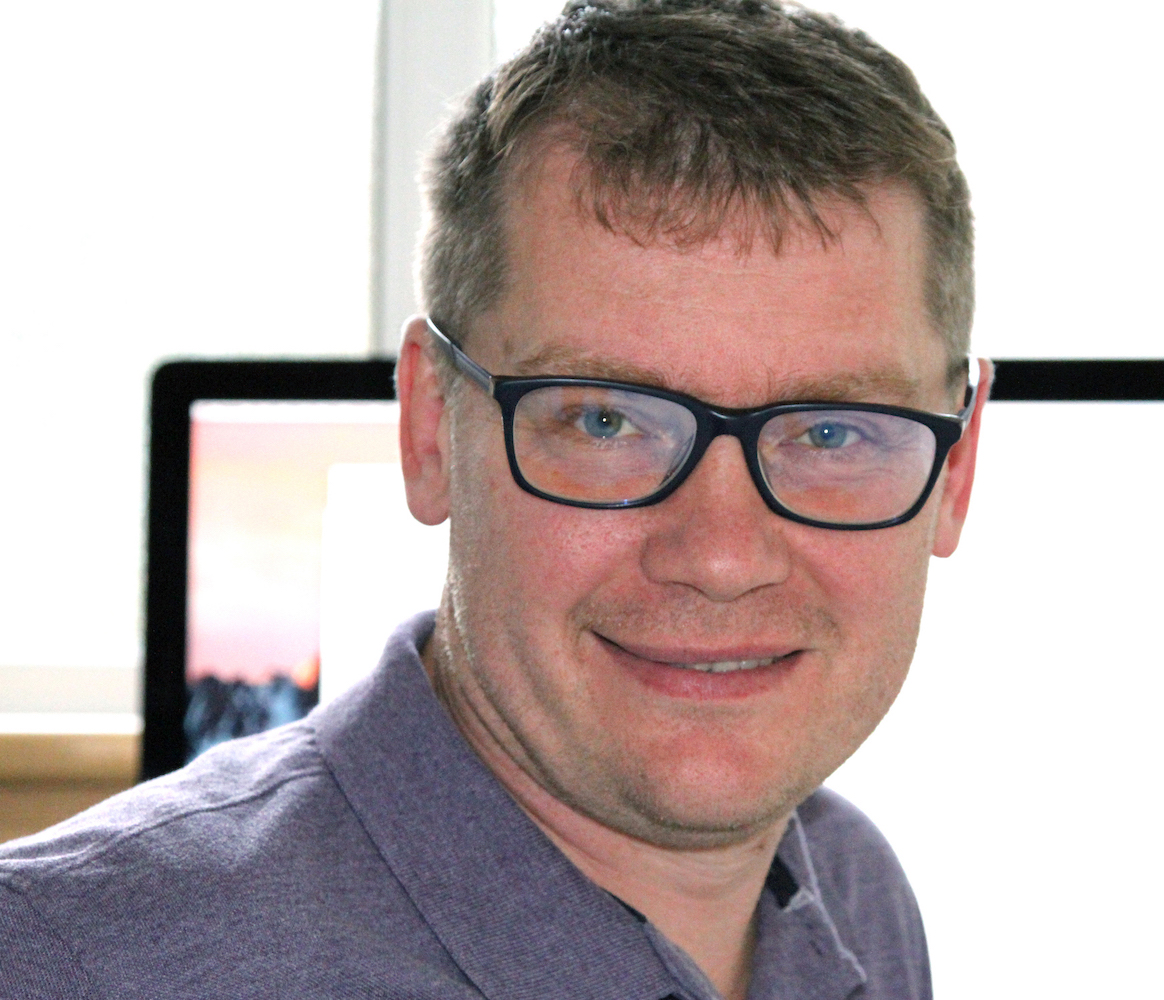
- Born: 1 January 1975 (age 51); Ulan-Ude, Russia
- Education: Novosibirsk State University; University of Gothenburg
- Scientific career
- Fields: Mathematics
- Workplaces: Reykjavík University; University of Strathclyde
- Thesis: Generalized patterns in words and permutations (2003)
- Doctoral advisor: Einar Steingrímsson
- Website: personal.strath.ac.uk/sergey.kitaev/index.html

Sergey Kitaev (Russian: Сергей Владимирович Китаев; born 1 January 1975 in Ulan-Ude) is a Professor of Mathematics at the University of Strathclyde, Glasgow, Scotland. He obtained his Ph.D. in mathematics from the University of Gothenburg in 2003 under the supervision of Einar Steingrímsson. Kitaev's research interests concern aspects of combinatorics and graph theory.

== Contributions ==
Kitaev is best known for his book Patterns in permutations and words (2011), an introduction to the field of permutation patterns. He is also the author (with Vadim Lozin) of Words and graphs (2015) on the theory of word-representable graphs which he pioneered.

Kitaev has written over 120 research articles in mathematics. Of particular note is his work generalizing vincular patterns to having partially ordered entries, a classification (with Anders Claesson) of bijections between 321- and 132-avoiding permutations, and a solution (with Steve Seif) of the word problem for the Perkins semigroup, as well as his work on word-representable graphs.

== Selected publications ==
- Kitaev, Sergey (2005). "Partially ordered generalized patterns". Discrete Mathematics. 298 (1–3): 212–229. doi:10.1016/j.disc.2004.03.017.
- Claesson, Anders; Kitaev, Sergey (2008). "Classification of bijections between 321- and 132-avoiding permutations" (PDF). Séminaire Lotharingien de Combinatoire. 60.
- Kitaev, Sergey; Seif, Steve (2008). "Word problem of the Perkins semigroup via directed acyclic graphs". Order. 25 (3): 177–194. doi:10.1007/s11083-008-9083-7.
- Bousquet-Mélou, Mireille; Claesson, Anders; Dukes, Mark; Kitaev, Sergey (2010). "(2+2)-free posets, ascent sequences and pattern avoiding permutations". Journal of Combinatorial Theory, Series A. 117 (7): 884–909. arXiv:0806.0666. doi:10.1016/j.jcta.2009.12.007.
- Kitaev, Sergey (2011). Patterns in permutations and words. Springer. ISBN 978-3-642-17332-5.
- Kitaev, Sergey; Lozin, Vadim (2015). Words and graphs. Springer. ISBN 978-3-319-25857-7.
- Kitaev, Sergey (2017). "A comprehensive introduction to the theory of word-representable graphs". Developments in language theory, Lecture Notes in Computer Science 10396. Springer. ISBN 978-3-319-62809-7.
