= Karola Mészáros =

American mathematician

Karola Mészáros is an American mathematician focusing on algebraic combinatorics and geometric combinatorics, including the study of Schur polynomials, Schubert polynomials, Ehrhart polynomials, flow polytopes, and chip-firing games. She is a professor of mathematics at Cornell University.

== Education and career ==
Mészáros was a student at the Massachusetts Institute of Technology (MIT), where she received a bachelor's degree in mathematics in 2005 and completed a Ph.D. in 2010 under the supervision of Richard P. Stanley.

After another year as a lecturer at MIT, she became a postdoctoral researcher and National Science Foundation Postdoctoral Fellow at the University of Michigan from 2011 to 2012, before joining Cornell in 2012 as H. C. Wang Assistant Professor of mathematics, a non-tenure-track position. She shifted to a tenure-track assistant professorship in 2014, and was promoted to associate professor in 2020.

== Recognition ==
Mészáros received a National Science Foundation CAREER Award in 2019. She was elected to the 2026 class of Fellows of the American Mathematical Society.

== Personal life ==
Mészáros is married to Lionel Levine, also a mathematics professor at Cornell.
