= Shearer's inequality =

Shearer's inequality or also Shearer's lemma, in mathematics, is an inequality in information theory relating the entropy of a set of variables to the entropies of a collection of subsets. It is named for mathematician James B. Shearer.

Concretely, it states that if X_{1}, ..., X_{d} are random variables and S_{1}, ..., S_{n} are subsets of {1, 2, ..., d} such that every integer between 1 and d lies in at least r of these subsets, then

$$H[(X_1,\dots,X_d)] \leq \frac{1}{r}\sum_{i=1}^n H[(X_j)_{j\in S_i}]$$

where $H$ is entropy and $(X_{j})_{j\in S_{i}}$ is the Cartesian product of random variables $X_{j}$ with indices j in $S_{i}$.

The inequality generalizes the subadditivity property of entropy, which can be recovered by taking $S_i = \{i\}$ for $i \in \{1, \ldots, n\}$.

== Combinatorial version ==
Let $\mathcal{F}$ be a family of subsets of $[n]$ (possibly with repeats) with each $i\in [n]$ included in at least $t$ members of $\mathcal{F}$. Let $\mathcal{A}$ be another set of subsets of $[n]$. Then

$$\mathcal |\mathcal{A}|\leq \prod_{F\in \mathcal{F}}|\operatorname{trace}_{F}(\mathcal{A})|^{1/t}$$

where $\operatorname{trace}_{F}(\mathcal{A})=\{A\cap F:A\in\mathcal{A}\}$ the set of possible intersections of elements of $\mathcal{A}$ with $F$.

== See also ==
- Lovász local lemma
