= Cryptomorphism =

Non-obvious mathematical equivalence

In mathematics, two objects, especially systems of axioms or semantics for them, are called cryptomorphic if they are equivalent but not obviously equivalent. In particular, two definitions or axiomatizations of the same object are "cryptomorphic" if it is not obvious that they define the same object. Examples of cryptomorphic definitions abound in matroid theory and others can be found elsewhere, e.g., in group theory the definition of a group by a single operation of division, which is not obviously equivalent to the usual three "operations" of identity element, inverse, and multiplication.

This word is a play on the many morphisms in mathematics, but "cryptomorphism" is only very distantly related to "isomorphism", "homomorphism", or "morphisms". The equivalence may in a cryptomorphism, if it is not actual identity, be informal, or may be formalized in terms of a bijection or equivalence of categories between the mathematical objects defined by the two cryptomorphic axiom systems.

== Etymology ==
The word was coined by Garrett Birkhoff before 1967, for use in the third edition of his book Lattice Theory. Birkhoff did not give it a formal definition, though others working in the field have made some attempts since.

== Use in matroid theory ==
Its informal sense was popularized (and greatly expanded in scope) by Gian-Carlo Rota in the context of matroid theory: there are dozens of equivalent axiomatic approaches to matroids, but two different systems of axioms often look very different.

In his 1997 book Indiscrete Thoughts, Rota describes the situation as follows:

Like many other great ideas, matroid theory was invented by one of the great American pioneers, Hassler Whitney. His paper, which is still today the best entry to the subject, flagrantly reveals the unique peculiarity of this field, namely, the exceptional variety of cryptomorphic definitions for a matroid, embarrassingly unrelated to each other and exhibiting wholly different mathematical pedigrees. It is as if one were to condense all trends of present day mathematics onto a single finite structure, a feat that anyone would a priori deem impossible, were it not for the fact that matroids do exist.

Though there are many cryptomorphic concepts in mathematics outside of matroid theory and universal algebra, the word has not caught on among mathematicians generally. It is, however, in fairly wide use among researchers in matroid theory.

== See also ==
- Combinatorial class, an equivalence among combinatorial enumeration problems hinting at the existence of a cryptomorphism
