= Superpattern =

In the mathematical study of permutations and permutation patterns, a superpattern or universal permutation is a permutation that contains all of the patterns of a given length. More specifically, a k-superpattern contains all possible patterns of length k.

== Definitions and example ==
If π is a permutation of length n, represented as a sequence of the numbers from 1 to n in some order, and s = s_{1}, s_{2}, ..., s_{k} is a subsequence of π of length k, then s corresponds to a unique pattern, a permutation of length k whose elements are in the same order as s. That is, for each pair i and j of indexes, the i-th element of the pattern for s should be less than the j-th element if and only if the i-th element of s is less than the j-th element. Equivalently, the pattern is order-isomorphic to the subsequence. For instance, if π is the permutation 25314, then it has ten subsequences of length three, forming the following patterns:

Subsequence	Pattern
253	132
251	231
254	132
231	231
234	123
214	213
531	321
534	312
514	312
314	213

A permutation π is called a k-superpattern if its patterns of length k include all of the length-k permutations. For instance, the length-3 patterns of 25314 include all six of the length-3 permutations, so 25314 is a 3-superpattern. No 3-superpattern can be shorter, because any two subsequences that form the two patterns 123 and 321 can only intersect in a single position, so five symbols are required just to cover these two patterns.

== Length bounds ==
Arratia (1999) introduced the problem of determining the length of the shortest possible k-superpattern. He observed that there exists a superpattern of length k^{2} (given by the lexicographic ordering on the coordinate vectors of points in a square grid) and also observed that, for a superpattern of length n, it must be the case that it has at least as many subsequences as there are patterns. That is, it must be true that $\tbinom{n}{k}\ge k!$, from which it follows by Stirling's approximation that n ≥ k^{2}/e^{2}, where e ≈ 2.71828 is Euler's number. This lower bound was later improved very slightly by Chroman, Kwan, and Singhal (2021), who increased it to 1.000076k^{2}/e^{2}, disproving Arratia's conjecture that the k^{2}/e^{2} lower bound was tight.

The upper bound of k^{2} on superpattern length proven by Arratia is not tight. After intermediate improvements, Miller (2009) proved that there is a k-superpattern of length at most k(k + 1)/2 for every k. This bound was later improved by Engen and Vatter (2021), who lowered it to ⌈(k^{2} + 1)/2⌉.

Eriksson et al. conjectured that the true length of the shortest k-superpattern is asymptotic to k^{2}/2. However, this is in contradiction with a conjecture of Alon on random superpatterns described below.

== Random superpatterns ==
Researchers have also studied the length needed for a sequence generated by a random process to become a superpattern. Arratia (1999) observes that, because the longest increasing subsequence of a random permutation has length (with high probability) approximately 2√n, it follows that a random permutation must have length at least k^{2}/4 to have high probability of being a k-superpattern: permutations shorter than this will likely not contain the identity pattern. He attributes to Alon the conjecture that, for any ε > 0, with high probability, random permutations of length k^{2}/(4 − ε) will be k-superpatterns.

== See also ==
- Superpermutation
