= Skew-merged permutation =

In the theory of permutation patterns, a skew-merged permutation is a permutation that can be partitioned into an increasing sequence and a decreasing sequence. They were first studied by Stankova (1994) and given their name by Atkinson (1998).

== Characterization ==
The two smallest permutations that cannot be partitioned into an increasing and a decreasing sequence are 3412 and 2143. Stankova (1994) was the first to establish that a skew-merged permutation can also be equivalently defined as a permutation that avoids the two patterns 3412 and 2143.

A permutation is skew-merged if and only if its associated permutation graph is a split graph, a graph that can be partitioned into a clique (corresponding to the descending subsequence) and an independent set (corresponding to the ascending subsequence). The two forbidden patterns for skew-merged permutations, 3412 and 2143, correspond to two of the three forbidden induced subgraphs for split graphs, a four-vertex cycle and a graph with two disjoint edges, respectively. The third forbidden induced subgraph, a five-vertex cycle, cannot exist in a permutation graph.

== Enumeration ==
For $n=1,2,3,\dots$ the number of skew-merged permutations of length $n$ is

1, 2, 6, 22, 86, 340, 1340, 5254, 20518, 79932, 311028, 1209916, 4707964, 18330728, ... (sequence A029759 in the OEIS).

Atkinson (1998) was the first to show that the generating function of these numbers is

$$\frac{1-3x}{(1-2x)\sqrt{1-4x}},$$

from which it follows that the number of skew-merged permutations of length $n$ is given by the formula

$$\binom{2n}{n}-\sum_{m=0}^{n-1}2^{n-m-1}\binom{2m}{m}$$

and that these numbers obey the recurrence relation

$$P_n=\frac{(9n-8)P_{n-1} - (26n-46)P_{n-2} + (24n-60)P_{n-3}}{n}.$$

Another derivation of the generating function for skew-merged permutations was given by Albert & Vatter (2013).

== Computational complexity ==
Testing whether one permutation is a pattern in another can be solved efficiently when the larger of the two permutations is skew-merged, as shown by Albert et al. (2016).
