= Noncrossing partition =

Concept in combinatorial mathematics

There are 42 noncrossing and 10 crossing partitions of a 5-element set

The 14 noncrossing partitions of a 4-element set ordered by refinement in a Hasse diagram

In combinatorics, the topic of noncrossing partitions has assumed some importance because of (among other things) its application to the theory of free probability. The number of noncrossing partitions of a set of n elements is the nth Catalan number. The number of noncrossing partitions of an n-element set with k blocks is found in the Narayana number triangle.

== Definition ==
A partition of a set S is a set of non-empty, pairwise disjoint subsets of S, called "parts" or "blocks", whose union is all of S. Consider a finite set that is linearly ordered, or (equivalently, for purposes of this definition) arranged in a cyclic order like the vertices of a regular n-gon. No generality is lost by taking this set to be S = { 1, ..., n }. A noncrossing partition of S is a partition in which no two blocks "cross" each other, i.e., if a and b belong to one block and x and y to another, they are not arranged in the order a x b y. If one draws an arch based at a and b, and another arch based at x and y, then the two arches cross each other if the order is a x b y but not if it is a x y b or a b x y. In the latter two orders the partition { { a, b }, { x, y } } is noncrossing.

Crossing:	a x b y
Noncrossing:	a x y b
Noncrossing:	a b x y

Equivalently, if we label the vertices of a regular n-gon with the numbers 1 through n, the convex hulls of different blocks of the partition are disjoint from each other, i.e., they also do not "cross" each other. The set of all non-crossing partitions of S is denoted $\text{NC}(S)$. There is an obvious order isomorphism between $\text{NC}(S_1)$ and $\text{NC}(S_2)$ for two finite sets $S_1,S_2$ with the same size. That is, $\text{NC}(S)$ depends essentially only on the size of $S$ and we denote by $\text{NC}(n)$ the non-crossing partitions on any set of size n.

== Lattice structure ==
Like the set of all partitions of the set { 1, ..., n }, the set of all noncrossing partitions is a lattice when partially ordered by saying that a finer partition is "less than" a coarser partition. However, although it is a subset of the lattice of all set partitions, it is not a sublattice, because the subset is not closed under the join operation in the larger lattice. In other words, the finest partition that is coarser than both of two noncrossing partitions is not always the finest noncrossing partition that is coarser than both of them.

Unlike the lattice of all partitions of the set, the lattice of all noncrossing partitions is self-dual, i.e., it is order-isomorphic to the lattice that results from inverting the partial order ("turning it upside-down"). This can be seen by observing that each noncrossing partition has a non-crossing complement, called the Kreweras complement. Indeed, every interval within this lattice is self-dual.

== Role in free probability theory ==
The lattice of noncrossing partitions plays the same role in defining free cumulants in free probability theory that is played by the lattice of all partitions in defining joint cumulants in classical probability theory. To be more precise, let $(\mathcal{A},\phi)$ be a non-commutative probability space (See free probability for terminology.), $a\in\mathcal{A}$ a non-commutative random variable with free cumulants $(k_n)_{n\in\mathbb{N}}$. Then

$$\phi(a^n) = \sum_{\pi\in\text{NC}(n)} \prod_{j} k_j^{N_j(\pi)}$$

where $N_j(\pi)$ denotes the number of blocks of length $j$ in the non-crossing partition $\pi$. That is, the moments of a non-commutative random variable can be expressed as a sum of free cumulants over the sum non-crossing partitions. This is the free analogue of the moment-cumulant formula in classical probability. See also Wigner semicircle distribution.
