= Richard P. Stanley =

American mathematician (born 1944)

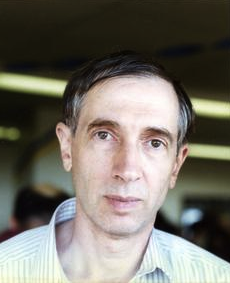
- Stanley in Oberwolfach, 1996
- Born: June 23, 1944 (age 82); New York City, New York
- Citizenship: American
- Education: California Institute of Technology; Harvard University
- Children: Kenneth Stanley
- Awards: Fellow, National Academy of Sciences (1995); Leroy P. Steele Prize for Mathematical Exposition (2001); Schock Prize (2003); Fellow, American Mathematical Society (2012); Leroy P. Steele Prize for Lifetime Achievement (2022)
- Scientific career
- Fields: Mathematics
- Workplaces: Massachusetts Institute of Technology; University of Miami
- Thesis: Ordered structures and partitions (1971)
- Doctoral advisor: Gian-Carlo Rota
- Doctoral students: Federico Ardila; Miklós Bóna; Lynne Butler; Karen L. Collins; Ira Gessel; Patricia Hersh; Caroline Klivans; Karola Mészáros; Greta Panova; Bruce Sagan; Einar Steingrímsson; John Stembridge; Bridget Tenner; Lauren Williams
- Website: math.mit.edu/~rstan

Richard Peter Stanley (born June 23, 1944) is an Emeritus Professor of Mathematics at the Massachusetts Institute of Technology, and an Arts and Sciences Distinguished Scholar at the University of Miami. From 2000 to 2010, he was the Norman Levinson Professor of Applied Mathematics at MIT. He received his Ph.D. at Harvard University in 1971 under the supervision of Gian-Carlo Rota. He is an expert in the field of combinatorics and its applications to other mathematical disciplines.

== Contributions ==
Stanley is known for his two-volume book Enumerative Combinatorics (1986–1999). He is also the author of Combinatorics and Commutative Algebra (1983) and well over 200 research articles in mathematics. He has served as thesis advisor to 60 doctoral students, many of whom have had distinguished careers in combinatorial research. Donald Knuth named Stanley as one of his combinatorial heroes in a 2023 interview.

== Awards and honors ==
Stanley's distinctions include membership in the National Academy of Sciences (elected in 1995), the 2001 Leroy P. Steele Prize for Mathematical Exposition, the 2003 Schock Prize, a plenary lecture at the International Congress of Mathematicians (in Madrid, Spain), and election in 2012 as a fellow of the American Mathematical Society. In 2022 he was awarded the Leroy P. Steele Prize for Lifetime Achievement.

== Selected publications ==
- Stanley, Richard P. (1996). Combinatorics and Commutative Algebra, 2nd ed. ISBN 0-8176-4369-9.
- Stanley, Richard P. (1997, 1999). Enumerative Combinatorics, Volumes 1 and 2. Cambridge University Press. ISBN 0-521-55309-1, ISBN 0-521-56069-1.

== See also ==
- Exponential formula
- Order polynomial
- Stanley decomposition
- Stanley's reciprocity theorem
