= Gábor Tardos =

Hungarian mathematician (born 1964)

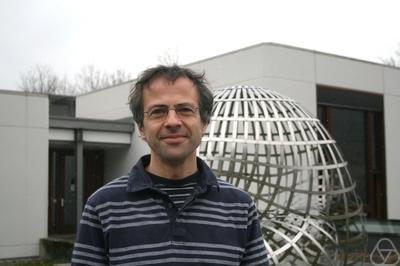
- Tardos at Oberwolfach, 2013
- Born: 11 July 1964 (age 62); Budapest
- Education: Eötvös Loránd University
- Awards: Gödel Prize (2020); Erdős Prize (2000); Alfréd Rényi Prize (1999); EMS Prize (1992)
- Scientific career
- Fields: Mathematics
- Workplaces: Central European University, Alfréd Rényi Mathematical Institute, Simon Fraser University, University of Chicago, Rutgers University, University of Toronto, Princeton Institute for Advanced Study.
- Doctoral advisor: László Babai and Péter Pál Pálfy

Gábor Tardos (born 11 July 1964) is a Hungarian mathematician, currently a professor at Central European University and previously a Canada Research Chair at Simon Fraser University. He works mainly in combinatorics and computer science. He is the younger brother of Éva Tardos.

== Education and career ==
Gábor Tardos received his PhD in Mathematics from Eötvös University, Budapest in 1988. His counsellors were László Babai and Péter Pálfy. He held postdoctoral posts at the University of Chicago, Rutgers University, University of Toronto and the Princeton Institute for Advanced Study. From 2005 to 2013, he served as a Canada Research Chair of discrete and computational geometry at Simon Fraser University. He then returned to Budapest to the Alfréd Rényi Institute of Mathematics where he has served as a research fellow since 1991.

== Mathematical results ==
Tardos started with a result in universal algebra: he exhibited a maximal clone of order-preserving operations that is not finitely generated. He obtained partial results concerning the Hanna Neumann conjecture. With his student, Adam Marcus, he proved a combinatorial conjecture of Zoltán Füredi and Péter Hajnal that was known to imply the Stanley–Wilf conjecture. With topological methods he proved that if $\mathcal{H}$ is a finite set system consisting of the unions of intervals on two disjoint lines, then $\tau(\mathcal{H})\leq 2\nu(\mathcal{H})$ holds, where $\tau(\mathcal{H})$ is the least number of points covering all elements of $\mathcal{H}$ and $\nu(\mathcal{H})$ is the size of the largest disjoint subsystem of $\mathcal{H}$. Tardos worked out a method for optimal probabilistic fingerprint codes. Although the mathematical content is hard, the algorithm is easy to implement.

== Awards ==
He received the European Mathematical Society prize for young researchers at the European Congress of Mathematics in 1992 and the Prize of the Hungarian Academy of Sciences for Young Researchers. In 1999 he received the Erdős Prize from the Hungarian Academy of Sciences and the Alfréd Rényi Prize of the Alfréd Rényi Institute of Mathematics.

He received a Lendület Grant from the Hungarian Academy of Sciences (2009) specifically devised to keep outstanding researchers in Hungary. In 2020, he received the Gödel Prize for the algorithmic version of the Lovász local lemma that he developed together with Robin Moser.

In 2018, Tardos was an invited speaker at the International Congress of Mathematicians in Rio de Janeiro.

== Selected publications ==
- ——— (2003), "Optimal probabilistic fingerprint codes", Proceedings of the thirty-fifth annual ACM symposium on Theory of computing, vol. 55, pp. 116–125, doi:10.1145/780542.780561, ISBN 978-1-58113-674-6, S2CID 52862015.
- ——— (1995), "Transversals of 2-intervals, a topological approach", Combinatorica, 15: 123–134, doi:10.1007/bf01294464, S2CID 206793373.
- ———; Ben-David, S.; Borodin, A.; Karp, R.; Wigderson, A. (1994), "On the power of randomization in on-line algorithms", Algorithmica, 11: 2–14, doi:10.1007/bf01294260, S2CID 26771869.
- ——— (1986), "A maximal clone of monotone operations which is not finitely generated", Order, 3 (3): 211–218, doi:10.1007/bf00400284, S2CID 124962475.
