= List of group theory topics =

In abstract algebra, group theory studies the algebraic structures known as groups. The concept of a group is central to abstract algebra: other well-known algebraic structures, such as rings, fields, and vector spaces, can all be seen as groups endowed with additional operations and axioms. Groups recur throughout mathematics, and the methods of group theory have influenced many parts of algebra. Linear algebraic groups and Lie groups are two branches of group theory that have experienced advances and have become subject areas in their own right.

Various physical systems, such as crystals and the hydrogen atom, and three of the four known fundamental forces in the universe, may be modelled by symmetry groups. Thus group theory and the closely related representation theory have many important applications in physics, chemistry, and materials science. Group theory is also central to public key cryptography.

== Structures and operations ==
- Conjugacy class sum
- Central extension
- Direct product of groups
- Direct sum of groups
- Extension problem
- Free abelian group
- Free group
- Free product
- Generating set of a group
- Group cohomology
- Group extension
- Presentation of a group
- Product of group subsets
- Schur multiplier
- Semidirect product
- Sylow theorems
  - Hall subgroup
- Wreath product

== Basic properties of groups ==
- Butterfly lemma
- Center of a group
- Centralizer and normalizer
- Characteristic subgroup
- Commutator
- Composition series
- Conjugacy class
- Conjugate closure
- Conjugation of isometries in Euclidean space
- Core (group)
- Coset
- Derived group
- Euler's theorem
- Fitting subgroup
  - Generalized Fitting subgroup
- Hamiltonian group
- Identity element
- Lagrange's theorem
- Multiplicative inverse
- Normal subgroup
- Perfect group
- p-core
- Schreier refinement theorem
- Subgroup
- Transversal (combinatorics)
- Torsion subgroup
- Zassenhaus lemma

=== Group homomorphisms ===
- Automorphism
- Automorphism group
- Factor group
- Fundamental theorem on homomorphisms
- Group homomorphism
- Group isomorphism
- Homomorphism
- Isomorphism theorem
- Inner automorphism
- Order automorphism
- Outer automorphism group
- Quotient group

== Basic types of groups ==
- Examples of groups
- Abelian group
- Cyclic group
  - Rank of an abelian group
- Dicyclic group
- Dihedral group
- Divisible group
- Finitely generated abelian group
- Group representation
- Klein four-group
- List of small groups
- Locally cyclic group
- Nilpotent group
- Non-abelian group
- Solvable group
- P-group
- Pro-finite group

=== Simple groups and their classification ===
- Classification of finite simple groups
- Alternating group
- Borel subgroup
- Chevalley group
- Conway group
- Feit–Thompson theorem
- Fischer group
- General linear group
- Group of Lie type
- Group scheme
- HN group
- Janko group
- Lie group
  - Simple Lie group
- Linear algebraic group
- List of finite simple groups
- Mathieu group
- Monster group
  - Baby Monster group
  - Bimonster
- Projective group
- Reductive group
- Simple group
  - Quasisimple group
- Special linear group
- Symmetric group
- Thompson group (finite)
- Tits group
- Weyl group

=== Permutation and symmetry groups ===
- Arithmetic group
- Braid group
- Burnside's lemma
- Cayley's theorem
- Coxeter group
- Crystallographic group
- Crystallographic point group, Schoenflies notation
- Discrete group
- Euclidean group
- Even and odd permutations
- Frieze group
- Frobenius group
- Fuchsian group
- Geometric group theory
- Group action
- Homogeneous space
- Hyperbolic group
- Isometry group
- Orbit (group theory)
- Permutation
- Permutation group
- Rubik's Cube group
- Space group
- Stabilizer subgroup
- Steiner system
- Strong generating set
- Symmetry
- Symmetric group
- Symmetry group
- Wallpaper group

== Concepts groups share with other mathematics ==
- Associativity
- Bijection
- Bilinear operator
- Binary operation
- Commutative
- Congruence relation
- Equivalence class
- Equivalence relation
- Lattice (group)
- Lattice (discrete subgroup)
- Multiplication table
- Prime number
- Up to

== Mathematical objects making use of a group operation ==
- Abelian variety
- Algebraic group
- Banach–Tarski paradox
- Category of groups
- Dimensional analysis
- Elliptic curve
- Galois group
- Gell-Mann matrices
- Group object
- Hilbert space
- Integer
- Lie group
- Matrix
- Modular arithmetic
- Number
- Pauli matrices
- Real number
- Quaternion
  - Quaternion group
- Tensor

== Mathematical fields and topics making important use of group theory ==
- Algebraic geometry
- Algebraic topology
- Discrete space
- Fundamental group
- Geometry
- Homology
- Minkowski's theorem
- Topological group

== Algebraic structures related to groups ==
- Field
- Finite field
- Galois theory
- Grothendieck group
- Group ring
- Group with operators
- Heap
- Linear algebra
- Magma
- Module
- Monoid
- Monoid ring
- Quandle
- Quasigroup
- Quantum group
- Ring
- Semigroup
- Vector space

== Group representations ==
- Affine representation
- Character theory
- Great orthogonality theorem
- Maschke's theorem
- Monstrous moonshine
- Projective representation
- Representation theory
- Schur's lemma

== Computational group theory ==
- Coset enumeration
- Schreier's subgroup lemma
- Schreier–Sims algorithm
- Todd–Coxeter algorithm

== Applications ==
- Computer algebra system
- Cryptography
  - Discrete logarithm
  - Triple DES
  - Caesar cipher
- Exponentiating by squaring
- Knapsack problem
- Shor's algorithm
- Standard Model
- Symmetry in physics

== Famous problems ==
- Burnside's problem
- Classification of finite simple groups
- Herzog–Schönheim conjecture
- Subset sum problem
- Whitehead problem
- Word problem for groups

== Other topics ==
- Amenable group
- Capable group
- Commensurability (group theory)
- Compact group
- Compactly generated group
- Complete group
- Complex reflection group
- Congruence subgroup
- Continuous symmetry
- Frattini subgroup
- Growth rate
- Heisenberg group, discrete Heisenberg group
- Molecular symmetry
- Nielsen transformation
- Reflection group
- Tarski monster group
- Thompson groups
- Tietze transformation
- Transfer (group theory)

== Group theorists ==
- N. Abel
- M. Aschbacher
- R. Baer
- R. Brauer
- W. Burnside
- R. Carter
- A. Cauchy
- A. Cayley
- J.H. Conway
- R. Dedekind
- L.E. Dickson
- M. Dunwoody
- W. Feit
- B. Fischer
- H. Fitting
- G. Frattini
- G. Frobenius
- E. Galois
- G. Glauberman
- D. Gorenstein
- R.L. Griess
- M. Hall, Jr.
- P. Hall
- G. Higman
- D. Hilbert
- O. Hölder
- B. Huppert
- K. Iwasawa
- Z. Janko
- C. Jordan
- F. Klein
- A. Kurosh
- J.L. Lagrange
- C. Leedham-Green
- F.W. Levi
- Sophus Lie
- W. Magnus
- E. Mathieu
- G.A. Miller
- B.H. Neumann
- H. Neumann
- J. Nielson
- Emmy Noether
- Ø. Ore
- O. Schreier
- I. Schur
- R. Steinberg
- M. Suzuki
- L. Sylow
- J. Thompson
- J. Tits
- Helmut Wielandt
- H. Zassenhaus
- M. Zorn

== See also ==
- List of abstract algebra topics
- List of category theory topics
- List of Lie group topics
