= List of permutation topics =

This is a list of topics on mathematical permutations.

== Particular kinds of permutations ==
- Alternating permutation
- Circular shift
- Cyclic permutation
- Derangement
- Even and odd permutations—see Parity of a permutation
- Josephus permutation
- Parity of a permutation
- Separable permutation
- Stirling permutation
- Superpattern
- Transposition (mathematics)
- Unpredictable permutation

== Combinatorics of permutations ==
- Bijection
- Combination
- Costas array
- Cycle index
- Cycle notation
- Cycles and fixed points
- Cyclic order
- Direct sum of permutations
- Enumerations of specific permutation classes
- Factorial
  - Falling factorial
- Permutation matrix
  - Generalized permutation matrix
- Inversion (discrete mathematics)
- Major index
- Ménage problem
- Permutation graph
- Permutation pattern
- Permutation polynomial
- Permutohedron
- Rencontres numbers
- Robinson–Schensted correspondence
- Sum of permutations:
  - Direct sum of permutations
  - Skew sum of permutations
- Stanley–Wilf conjecture
- Symmetric function
- Szymanski's conjecture
- Twelvefold way

== Permutation groups and other algebraic structures ==
=== Groups ===
- Alternating group
- Automorphisms of the symmetric and alternating groups
- Block (permutation group theory)
- Cayley's theorem
- Cycle index
- Frobenius group
- Galois group of a polynomial
- Jucys–Murphy element
- Landau's function
- Oligomorphic group
- O'Nan–Scott theorem
- Parker vector
- Permutation group
- Place-permutation action
- Primitive permutation group
- Rank 3 permutation group
- Representation theory of the symmetric group
- Schreier vector
- Strong generating set
- Symmetric group
- Symmetric inverse semigroup
- Weak order of permutations
- Wreath product
- Young symmetrizer
- Zassenhaus group
- Zolotarev's lemma

=== Other algebraic structures ===
- Burnside ring

== Mathematical analysis ==
- Conditionally convergent series
- Riemann series theorem
  - Lévy–Steinitz theorem

== Mathematics applicable to physical sciences ==
- Antisymmetrizer
- Identical particles
- Levi-Civita symbol

== Number theory ==
- Permutable prime

== Algorithms and information processing ==
- Bit-reversal permutation
- Claw-free permutation
- Heap's algorithm
- Permutation automaton
- Schreier vector
- Sorting algorithm
- Sorting network
- Substitution–permutation network
- Steinhaus–Johnson–Trotter algorithm
- Tompkins–Paige algorithm

=== Cryptography ===
- Permutation box
- Substitution box
- Permutation cipher
- Substitution cipher
- Transposition cipher

== Probability, stochastic processes, and statistics ==
- Combinatorial data analysis
- Ewens' sampling formula
- Fisher–Yates shuffle
- Order statistic
- Permutation test
- Permutational analysis of variance
- Rankit
- Resampling (statistics)
- Seriation (statistics)

=== Random permutations ===
- Golomb–Dickman constant
- Random permutation
- Random permutation statistics

== Music ==
- Change ringing
- Method ringing
- Permutation (music)

== Games ==
- Faro shuffle
- Fifteen puzzle
- Shuffling
