= Nielsen–Schreier theorem =

Theorem that every subgroup of a free group is itself free

In group theory, a branch of mathematics, the Nielsen–Schreier theorem states that every subgroup of a free group is itself free. It is named after Jakob Nielsen and Otto Schreier.

== Statement of the theorem ==
A free group may be defined from a group presentation consisting of a set of generators with no relations. That is, every element is a product of some sequence of generators and their inverses, but these elements do not obey any equations except those trivially following from gg^{−1} = 1. The elements of a free group may be described as all possible reduced words, those strings of generators and their inverses in which no generator is adjacent to its own inverse. Two reduced words may be multiplied by concatenating them and then removing any generator-inverse pairs that result from the concatenation.

The Nielsen–Schreier theorem states that if H is a subgroup of a free group G, then H is also a free group. That is, there exists a set S of elements which generate H, with no nontrivial relations among the elements of S.

The Nielsen–Schreier formula, or Schreier index formula, quantifies the result in the case where the subgroup has finite index: if G is a free group of rank n (free on n generators), and H is a subgroup of finite index [G : H] = e, then H is free of rank $1 + e(n{-}1)$.

== Example ==
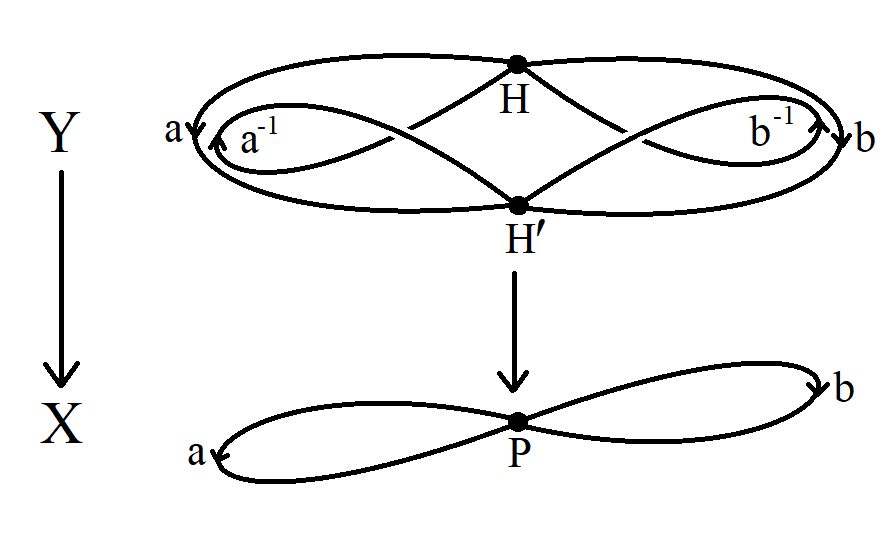
The free group G = π_{1}(X) has n = 2 generators corresponding to loops a,b from the base point P in X. The subgroup H of even-length words, with index e = [G : H] = 2, corresponds to the covering graph Y with two vertices corresponding to the cosets H and H' = aH = bH = a^{−1}H = b^{−}^{1}H, and two lifted edges for each of the original loop-edges a,b. Contracting one of the edges of Y gives a homotopy equivalence to a bouquet of three circles, so that H = π_{1}(Y) is a free group on three generators, for example aa, ab, ba.

Let G be the free group with two generators $a,b$, and let H be the subgroup consisting of all reduced words of even length (products of an even number of letters $a,b,a^{-1},b^{-1}$). Then H is generated by its six elements $p=aa$, $q=ab$, $r=ba$, $s=bb$, $t=ab^{-1}$, $u=a^{-1}b$. A factorization of any reduced word in H into these generators and their inverses may be constructed simply by taking consecutive pairs of letters in the reduced word. However, this is not a set of free generators of H (not a basis of H) because the last three generators can be written in terms of the first three as $s=rp^{-1}q,\ t=pr^{-1},\ u=p^{-1}q$. Rather, H is generated as a free group by the three elements $p=aa,\ q=ab,\ r=ba,$ which have no relations among them; or instead by several other triples of the six redundant generators. Further, G is free on n = 2 generators, H has index e = [G : H] = 2 in G, and H is free on 1 + e(n–1) = 3 generators. The Nielsen–Schreier theorem states that like H, every subgroup of a free group can be generated as a free group, and if the index of H is finite, its rank is given by the index formula.

== Proof ==
A short proof of the Nielsen–Schreier theorem uses the algebraic topology of fundamental groups and covering spaces. A free group G on a set of generators is the fundamental group of a bouquet of circles, a topological graph X with a single vertex and with a loop-edge for each generator. Any subgroup H of the fundamental group is itself the fundamental group of a connected covering space Y → X. The space Y is a (possibly infinite) topological graph, the Schreier coset graph having one vertex for each coset in G/H. In any connected topological graph, it is possible to shrink the edges of a spanning tree of the graph, producing a bouquet of circles that has the same fundamental group H. Since H is the fundamental group of a bouquet of circles, it is itself free.

The rank of H can be computed using two properties of Euler characteristic of a graph (the number of vertices minus the number of edges), which remains invariant under contraction of edges (homotopy). The first property is that the Euler characteristic of a bouquet of s circles is 1 - s. The second property is multiplicativity in covering spaces: If Y is a degree-d cover of X, then

$\chi(Y) = d \cdot \chi(X)$.

Now suppose H is a subgroup of the free group G, with index [G : H] = e. As above, consider the covering graph Y corresponding to H, and contract edges to make it a bouquet of r circles, so that H is a free group of rank r. Applying the two properties of Euler characteristic gives:

$\chi(Y) = 1 - r$

and

$\chi(Y) = e \cdot \chi(X) = e (1 - n).$

Combining these equations, we obtain $r = 1 - e (1-n) = 1 + e (n - 1).$

This proof appears in May's Concise Course. An equivalent proof using homology and the first Betti number of Y is due to Reinhold Baer and Friedrich Levi (1936). The original proof by Schreier forms the Schreier graph in a different way as a quotient of the Cayley graph of G modulo the action of H.

According to Schreier's subgroup lemma, a set of generators for a free presentation of H may be constructed from cycles in the covering graph formed by concatenating a spanning tree path from a base point (the coset of the identity) to one of the cosets, a single non-tree edge, and an inverse spanning tree path from the other endpoint of the edge back to the base point.

== Axiomatic foundations ==
Although several different proofs of the Nielsen–Schreier theorem are known, they all depend on the axiom of choice. In the proof based on fundamental groups of bouquets, for instance, the axiom of choice appears in the guise of the statement that every connected graph has a spanning tree. The use of this axiom is necessary, as there exist models of Zermelo–Fraenkel set theory in which the axiom of choice and the Nielsen–Schreier theorem are both false. The Nielsen–Schreier theorem in turn implies a weaker version of the axiom of choice, for finite sets.

== History ==
The Nielsen–Schreier theorem is a non-abelian analogue of an older result of Richard Dedekind, that every subgroup of a free abelian group is free abelian.

Jakob Nielsen (1921) originally proved a restricted form of the theorem, stating that any finitely-generated subgroup of a free group is free. His proof involves performing a sequence of Nielsen transformations on the subgroup's generating set that reduce their length (as reduced words in the free group from which they are drawn). Otto Schreier proved the Nielsen–Schreier theorem in its full generality in his 1926 habilitation thesis, Die Untergruppen der freien Gruppe, also published in 1927 in Abh. math. Sem. Hamburg. Univ.

The topological proof based on fundamental groups of bouquets of circles is due to Reinhold Baer and Friedrich Levi (1936). Another topological proof, based on the Bass–Serre theory of group actions on trees, was published by Jean-Pierre Serre (1969).

== See also ==
- Fundamental theorem of cyclic groups, a similar result for cyclic groups that in the infinite case may be seen as a special case of the Nielsen–Schreier theorem
- Kurosh subgroup theorem
