= BSGS =

The initialism BSGS has two meanings, both related to group theory in mathematics:

- Baby-step giant-step, an algorithm for solving the discrete logarithm problem
- The combination of a base and strong generating set (SGS) for a permutation group
