= Morton L. Curtis =

American mathematician

Morton Landers Curtis (November 11, 1921 – February 4, 1989) was an American mathematician, an expert on group theory and the W. L. Moody, Jr. Professor of Mathematics at Rice University.

Born in Texas, Curtis earned a bachelor's degree in 1948 from Texas A&I University, and received his Ph.D. in 1951 from the University of Michigan under the supervision of Raymond Louis Wilder. Subsequently, he taught mathematics at Florida State University before moving to Rice. At Rice, he was the Ph.D. advisor of well-known mathematician John Morgan.

Curtis is, with James J. Andrews, the namesake of the Andrews–Curtis conjecture concerning Nielsen transformations of balanced group presentations. Andrews and Curtis formulated the conjecture in a 1965 paper; it remains open. Together with Gustav A. Hedlund and Roger Lyndon, he proved the Curtis–Hedlund–Lyndon theorem characterizing cellular automata as being defined by continuous equivariant functions on a shift space.

Curtis was the author of two books, Matrix Groups (Springer-Verlag, 1979), and Abstract Linear Algebra (Springer-Verlag, 1990).
