= Rose (topology) =

Type of topological space

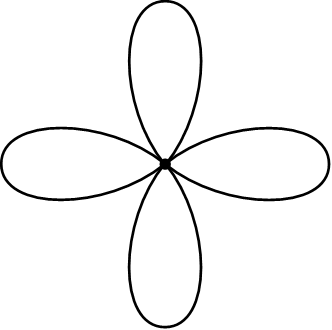
A rose with four petals.

In mathematics, a rose (also known as a bouquet of n circles) is a topological space obtained by gluing together a collection of circles along a single point. The circles of the rose are called petals. Roses are important in algebraic topology, where they are closely related to free groups.

== Definition ==
The fundamental group of the figure eight is the free group generated by a and b

A rose is a wedge sum of circles. That is, the rose is the quotient space C/S, where C is a disjoint union of circles and S a set consisting of one point from each circle. As a cell complex, a rose has a single vertex, and one edge for each circle. This makes it a simple example of a topological graph.

A rose with n petals can also be obtained by identifying n points on a single circle. The rose with two petals is known as the figure eight.

== Relation to free groups ==
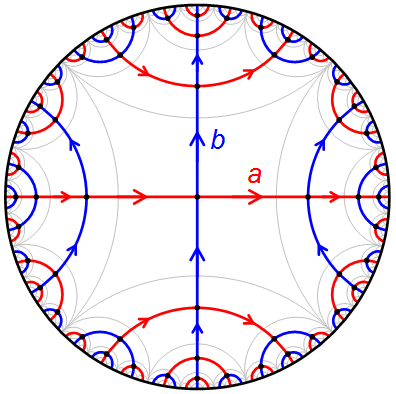
The universal cover of the figure eight can be visualized by the Cayley graph of the free group on two generators a and b

The fundamental group of a rose is free, with one generator for each petal. The universal cover is an infinite tree, which can be identified with the Cayley graph of the free group. (This is a special case of the presentation complex associated to any presentation of a group.)

The intermediate covers of the rose correspond to subgroups of the free group. The observation that any cover of a rose is a graph provides a simple proof that every subgroup of a free group is free (the Nielsen–Schreier theorem)

Because the universal cover of a rose is contractible, the rose is actually an Eilenberg–MacLane space for the associated free group F. This implies that the cohomology groups H^{n}(F) are trivial for n ≥ 2.

== Other properties ==
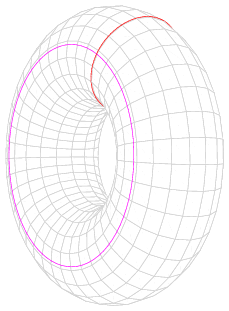
A figure eight in the torus.

- Any connected graph is homotopy equivalent to a rose. Specifically, the rose is the quotient space of the graph obtained by collapsing a spanning tree.
- A disc with n points removed (or a sphere with n + 1 points removed) deformation retracts onto a rose with n petals. One petal of the rose surrounds each of the removed points.
- A torus with one point removed deformation retracts onto a figure eight, namely the union of two generating circles. More generally, a surface of genus g with one point removed deformation retracts onto a rose with 2g petals, namely the boundary of a fundamental polygon.
- A rose can have infinitely many petals, leading to a fundamental group which is free on infinitely many generators. The rose with countably infinitely many petals is similar to the Hawaiian earring: there is a continuous bijection from this rose onto the Hawaiian earring, but the two are not homeomorphic. A rose with infinitely many petals is not compact, whereas the Hawaiian earring is compact.

== See also ==
- Bouquet graph
- Free group
- List of topologies
- Petal projection
- Quadrifolium
- Topological graph
