= Paolo Zanardi =

Paolo Zanardi is an Italian physicist and professor of physics and mathematics at the University of Southern California. His work is primarily focused on quantum mechanics and computing, specifically about quantum information processing and its applications. In 2011, he was elected a Fellow of the American Physical Society under the Division of Quantum Information.

== Education and career ==
Paolo Zanardi earned a Masters Degree in Physics from the Università degli Studi di Modena in 1992. Later, he earned a PhD in Physics from the Università di Roma Tor Vergata in 1995.

After his doctoral studies, Zanardi worked with the ISI Foundation as a Scientific consultant and as a Scientific Coordinator for the European FET Project TOPQIP from 2001 to 2011. Paolo Zanardi started working at the University of Southern California as an associate professor in 2007 and then becoming a full professor in 2011.

== Research ==
His work focuses on the study of quantum mechanics, specifically within the topic of quantum information processing (QIP), developing algorithms using both topological and geometrical approaches, the physical implementation of QIP devices, looking at methods to reduce the scrambling of information through quantum circuits, and performing decoherence control on quantum computing systems.
