= HN group =

Term in mathematics, group theory

In mathematics, in the field of group theory, a HN group or hypernormalizing group is a group with the property that the hypernormalizer of any subnormal subgroup is the whole group.

For finite groups, this is equivalent to the condition that the normalizer of any subnormal subgroup be subnormal.

Some facts about HN groups:

- Subgroups of solvable HN groups are solvable HN groups.
- Metanilpotent A-groups are HN groups.
