= Tietze transformations =

In group theory, Tietze transformations are used to transform a given presentation of a group into another, often simpler presentation of the same group. These transformations are named after Heinrich Tietze who introduced them in a paper in 1908.

A presentation is in terms of generators and relations; formally speaking the presentation is a pair of a set of named generators, and a set of words in the free group on the generators that are taken to be the relations. Tietze transformations are built up of elementary steps, each of which individually rather evidently takes the presentation to a presentation of an isomorphic group. These elementary steps may operate on generators or relations, and are of four kinds.

== Adding a relation ==
If a relation can be derived from the existing relations then it may be added to the presentation without changing the group. Let G=〈 x | x^{3}=1 〉 be a finite presentation for the cyclic group of order 3. Multiplying x^{3}=1 on both sides by x^{3} we get x^{6} = x^{3} = 1 so x^{6} = 1 is derivable from x^{3}=1. Hence G=〈 x | x^{3}=1, x^{6}=1 〉 is another presentation for the same group.

== Removing a relation ==
If a relation in a presentation can be derived from the other relations then it can be removed from the presentation without affecting the group. In G = 〈 x | x^{3} = 1, x^{6} = 1 〉 the relation x^{6} = 1 can be derived from x^{3} = 1 so it can be safely removed. Note, however, that if x^{3} = 1 is removed from the presentation the group G = 〈 x | x^{6} = 1 〉 defines the cyclic group of order 6 and does not define the same group. Care must be taken to show that any relations that are removed are consequences of the other relations.

== Adding a generator ==
Given a presentation it is possible to add a new generator that is expressed as a word in the original generators. Starting with G = 〈 x | x^{3} = 1 〉 and letting y = x^{2} the new presentation G = 〈 x,y | x^{3} = 1, y = x^{2} 〉 defines the same group.

== Removing a generator ==
If a relation can be formed where one of the generators is a word in the other generators then that generator may be removed. In order to do this it is necessary to replace all occurrences of the removed generator with its equivalent word. The presentation for the elementary abelian group of order 4, G=〈 x,y,z | x = yz, y^{2}=1, z^{2}=1, x=x^{−1} 〉 can be replaced by G = 〈 y,z | y^{2} = 1, z^{2} = 1, (yz) = (yz)^{−1} 〉 by removing x.

== Examples ==
Let G = 〈 x,y | x^{3} = 1, y^{2} = 1, (xy)^{2} = 1 〉 be a presentation for the symmetric group of degree three. The generator x corresponds to the permutation (1,2,3) and y to (2,3). Through Tietze transformations this presentation can be converted to G = 〈 y, z | (zy)^{3} = 1, y^{2} = 1, z^{2} = 1 〉, where z corresponds to (1,2).

G = 〈 x,y | x^{3} = 1, y^{2} = 1, (xy)^{2} = 1 〉	(start)
G = 〈 x,y,z| x^{3} = 1, y^{2} = 1, (xy)^{2} = 1, z = xy 〉	rule 3 — Add the generator z
G = 〈 x,y,z | x^{3} = 1, y^{2} = 1, (xy)^{2} = 1, x = zy 〉	rules 1 and 2 — Add x = zy^{−1} = zy and remove z = xy
G = 〈 y,z | (zy)^{3} = 1, y^{2} = 1, z^{2} = 1 〉	rule 4 - Remove the generator x

== Tietze's Theorem ==
Tietze's theorem states that any two finite presentations of the same group can be obtained from one another by a finite sequence of Tietze transformations.

== See also ==
- Nielsen Transformation
- Andrews-Curtis Conjecture
