= Bouquet graph =

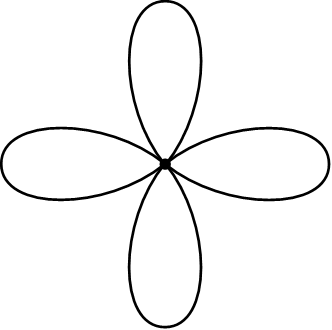
$B_4$, a bouquet with one vertex and four self-loop edges

In mathematics, a bouquet graph $B_m$, for an integer parameter $m$, is an undirected graph with one vertex and $m$ edges, all of which are self-loops. It is the graph-theoretic analogue of the topological rose, a space of $m$ circles joined at a point. When the context of graph theory is clear, it can be called more simply a bouquet.

Ribbon graph representation of an embedding of $B_3$ onto the projective plane.

Although bouquets have a very simple structure as graphs, they are of some importance in topological graph theory because their graph embeddings can still be non-trivial. In particular, every cellularly embedded graph can be reduced to an embedded bouquet by a partial duality applied to the edges of any spanning tree of the graph, or alternatively by contracting the edges of any spanning tree.

In graph-theoretic approaches to group theory, every Cayley–Serre graph (a variant of Cayley graphs with doubled edges) can be represented as the covering graph of a bouquet.
