= Wedge sum =

Space in topology mathematics

A wedge sum of two circles

In topology, the wedge sum is a "one-point union" of a family of topological spaces. Specifically, if X and Y are pointed spaces (i.e. topological spaces with distinguished basepoints $x_0$ and $y_0$) the wedge sum of X and Y is the quotient space of the disjoint union of X and Y by the identification $x_0 \sim y_0:$
$$X \vee Y = (X \sqcup Y)\;/{\sim},$$

where $\,\sim\,$ is the equivalence closure of the relation $\left\{ \left(x_0, y_0\right) \right\}.$ More generally, suppose $\left(X_i\right)_{i \in I}$ is an indexed family of pointed spaces with basepoints $\left(p_i\right)_{i \in I}.$ The wedge sum of the family is given by:
$$\bigvee_{i \in I} X_i = \bigsqcup_{i \in I} X_i\;/{\sim},$$
where $\,\sim\,$ is the equivalence closure of the relation $\left\{ \left(p_i, p_j\right) : i, j \in I\right\}.$ In other words, the wedge sum is the joining of several spaces at a single point. This definition is sensitive to the choice of the basepoints $\left(p_i\right)_{i \in I},$ unless the spaces $\left(X_i\right)_{i \in I}$ are homogeneous.

The wedge sum is again a pointed space, and the binary operation is associative and commutative (up to homeomorphism).

Sometimes the wedge sum is called the wedge product, but this is not the same concept as the exterior product, which is also often called the wedge product.

== Examples ==
The wedge sum of two circles is homeomorphic to a figure-eight space. The wedge sum of $n$ circles is often called a bouquet of circles, while a wedge product of arbitrary spheres is often called a bouquet of spheres.

A common construction in homotopy is to identify all of the points along the equator of an $n$-sphere $S^n$. Doing so results in two copies of the sphere, joined at the point that was the equator:
$$S^n/{\sim} = S^n \vee S^n.$$

Let $\Psi$ be the map $\Psi : S^n \to S^n \vee S^n,$ that is, of identifying the equator down to a single point. Then addition of two elements $f, g \in \pi_n(X,x_0)$ of the $n$-dimensional homotopy group $\pi_n(X,x_0)$ of a space $X$ at the distinguished point $x_0 \in X$ can be understood as the composition of $f$ and $g$ with $\Psi$:
$$f + g = (f \vee g) \circ \Psi.$$

Here, $f, g : S^n \to X$ are maps which take a distinguished point $s_0 \in S^n$ to the point $x_0 \in X.$ Note that the above uses the wedge sum of two functions, which is possible precisely because they agree at $s_0,$ the point common to the wedge sum of the underlying spaces.

== Categorical description ==
The wedge sum can be understood as the coproduct in the category of pointed spaces. Alternatively, the wedge sum can be seen as the pushout of the diagram $X \leftarrow \{ \bull \} \to Y$ in the category of topological spaces (where $\{ \bull \}$ is any one-point space).

== Properties ==
Van Kampen's theorem gives certain conditions (which are usually fulfilled for well-behaved spaces, such as CW complexes) under which the fundamental group of the wedge sum of two spaces $X$ and $Y$ is the free product of the fundamental groups of $X$ and $Y.$

== See also ==
- Connected sum
- Smash product
- Hawaiian earring, a topological space resembling, but not the same as, a wedge sum of countably many circles
