= Base (group theory) =

Let $G$ be a finite permutation group acting on a set $\Omega$. A sequence

$$B = [\beta_1,\beta_2,...,\beta_k]$$

of k distinct elements of $\Omega$ is a base for G if the only element of $G$ which fixes every $\beta_i \in B$ pointwise is the identity element of $G$.

Bases and strong generating sets are concepts of importance in computational group theory. A base and a strong generating set (together often called a BSGS) for a group can be obtained using the Schreier–Sims algorithm.

Not every group has a base. In particular, if a group action is not faithful, then no base exists. This is because by the definition of an unfaithful action, there are multiple elements of $G$ that fix every element in $B$ pointwise.

It is often beneficial to deal with bases and strong generating sets as these may be easier to work with than the entire group. A group may have a small base compared to the set it acts on. In the "best case", a base can have size 1, as in the case of the additive group of the integers. On the other hand, the symmetric groups and alternating groups have large bases (the symmetric group S_{n} has base size n − 1), and there are often specialized algorithms that deal with these cases.
