= Parker vector =

In mathematics, especially the field of group theory, the Parker vector is an integer vector that describes a permutation group in terms of the cycle structure of its elements, defined by Richard A. Parker.

== Definition ==
The Parker vector P of a permutation group G acting on a set of size n, is the vector whose kth component for k = 1, ..., n is given by:

$P_k = \frac{k}{|G|} \sum_{g \in G} c_k(g)$ where c_{k}(g) is the number of k-cycles in the cycle decomposition of g.

== Examples ==
For the group of even permutations on three elements, the Parker vector is (1,0,2). The group of all permutations on three elements has Parker vector (1,1,1). For any of the subgroups of the above with just two elements, the Parker vector is (2,1,0).The trivial subgroup has Parker vector (3,0,0).
