= Metanilpotent group =

In mathematics, in the field of group theory, a metanilpotent group is a group that is nilpotent by nilpotent. In other words, it has a normal nilpotent subgroup such that the quotient group is also nilpotent.

In symbols, $G$ is metanilpotent if there is a normal subgroup $N$ such that both $N$ and $G/N$ are nilpotent.

The following are clear:

- Every metanilpotent group is a solvable group.
- Every subgroup and every quotient of a metanilpotent group is metanilpotent.
