= Automorphism group of a free group =

In mathematical group theory, the automorphism group of a free group is a discrete group of automorphisms of a free group. The quotient by the inner automorphisms is the outer automorphism group of a free group, which is similar in some ways to the mapping class group of a surface.

== Presentation ==
Jakob Nielsen (1924) showed that the automorphisms defined by the elementary Nielsen transformations generate the full automorphism group of a finitely generated free group. Nielsen, and later Bernhard Neumann used these ideas to give finite presentations of the automorphism groups of free groups. This is also described in (Magnus, Karrass & Solitar 2004, p. 131, Th 3.2).

The automorphism group of the free group with ordered basis [ x_{1}, ..., x_{n} ] is generated by the following 4 elementary Nielsen transformations:

- Switch x_{1} and x_{2}
- Cyclically permute x_{1}, x_{2}, ..., x_{n}, to x_{2}, ..., x_{n}, x_{1}.
- Replace x_{1} with x_{1}^{−1}
- Replace x_{1} with x_{1}·x_{2}

These transformations are the analogues of the elementary row operations. Transformations of the first two kinds are analogous to row swaps, and cyclic row permutations. Transformations of the third kind correspond to scaling a row by an invertible scalar. Transformations of the fourth kind correspond to row additions.

Transformations of the first two types suffice to permute the generators in any order, so the third type may be applied to any of the generators, and the fourth type to any pair of generators.

Nielsen gave a rather complicated finite presentation using these generators, described in (Magnus, Karrass & Solitar 2004, p. 165, Section 3.5).

== Properties ==
The group $\mathrm{Aut}(F_n)$ is not linear as soon as $n \ge 3$.

It has Kazhdan's property (T) for all $n\ge 5$.

For $n=2$ linearity follows from that of the 4-strand braid group. and property (T) does not hold since $\mathrm{Aut}(F_2)$ surjects onto a free group. For $n=3$ property (T) does not hold.

== See also ==
- Out(Fn)
