= Heinrich Tietze =

Austrian mathematician

Heinrich Franz Friedrich Tietze
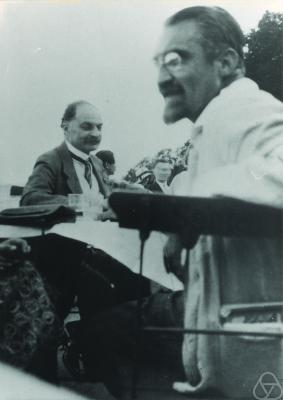
- Heinrich Tietze (right), with Friedrich Hartogs
- Born: 31 August 1880; Wiener Neustadt-Land District, Austria-Hungary
- Died: 17 February 1964 (aged 83); Munich, West Germany
- Known for: Tietze's graph Tietze extension theorem Tietze transformations Hauptvermutung; Lens space

Heinrich Franz Friedrich Tietze (August 31, 1880 – February 17, 1964) was an Austrian mathematician, famous for the Tietze extension theorem on functions from topological spaces to the real numbers. He also developed the Tietze transformations for group presentations, and was the first to pose the group isomorphism problem. Tietze's graph is also named after him; it describes the boundaries of a subdivision of the Möbius strip into six mutually-adjacent regions, found by Tietze as part of an extension of the four color theorem to non-orientable surfaces.

== Education and career ==
Tietze was the son of Emil Tietze and the grandson of Franz Ritter von Hauer, both of whom were Austrian geologists. He was born in Schleinz, Austria-Hungary, and studied mathematics at the Technische Hochschule Wien beginning in 1898. After additional studies in Munich, he returned to Vienna, completing his doctorate in 1904 and his habilitation in 1908.

From 1910 until 1918, Tietze taught mathematics in Brno, and was promoted to ordinary professor in 1913. He served in the Austrian army during World War I, and then returned to Brno, but in 1919, he took a position at the University of Erlangen, and then in 1925 moved again to the Ludwig-Maximilians-Universität München, where he remained for the rest of his career. One of his doctoral students was Georg Aumann. Tietze retired in 1950, and died in Munich, West Germany.

== Awards and honors ==
Tietze was a fellow of the Bavarian Academy of Sciences and a fellow of the Austrian Academy of Sciences.

== Publications ==
- Tietze, Heinrich (1957), "Über Schachturnier-Tabellen", Mathematische Zeitschrift, 67: 188–202, doi:10.1007/bf01258856, S2CID 123135166
- Tietze, Heinrich (1910), "Einige Bemerkungen zum Problem des Kartenfärbens auf einseitigen Flächen", DMV Annual Report
- Tietze, Heinrich (1915), "Über Funktionen, die auf einer abgeschlossenen Menge stetig sind", Journal für die reine und angewandte Mathematik, 145
- Über die mit Lineal und Zirkel und die mit dem rechten Zeichenwinkel lösbaren Konstruktionsaufgaben, Mathematische Zeitschrift vol.46, 1940
- mit Leopold Vietoris ''Beziehungen zwischen den verschiedenen Zweigen der Topologie'', Enzyklopädie der Mathematischen Wissenschaften 1929
- ''Über die Anzahl der stabilen Ruhelagen eines Würfels'', Elemente der Mathematik vol.3, 1948
- Über die topologische Invarianten mehrdimensionaler Mannigfaltigkeiten, Monatshefte für Mathematik und Physik, vol. 19, 1908, p.1-118
- Über Simony Knoten und Simony Ketten mit vorgeschriebenen singulären Primzahlen für die Figur und für ihr Spiegelbild, Mathematische Zeitschrift vol.49, 1943, p.351 (Knot theory)
- Tietze, Heinrich (1965) [1959], Famous problems of mathematics. Solved and unsolved mathematical problems from antiquity to modern times., New York: Graylock Press, MR 0181558
