= Zeeman conjecture =

Unproven mathematical hypothesis

In mathematics, the Zeeman conjecture or Zeeman's collapsibility conjecture asks whether given a finite contractible 2-dimensional CW complex $K$, the space $K\times [0,1]$ is collapsible. It can nowadays be restated as the claim that for any 2-complex $G$ which is homotopy equivalent to a point, some barycentric subdivision of $G \times [0, 1]$ is collapsible.

The conjecture, due to Christopher Zeeman, implies the Poincaré conjecture and the Andrews–Curtis conjecture.
