= Loop (graph theory) =

Edge that connects a node to itself

A graph with a loop on vertex 1

In graph theory, a loop (also called a self-loop or a buckle) is an edge that connects a vertex to itself. A simple graph contains no loops.

Depending on the context, a graph or a multigraph may be defined so as to either allow or disallow the presence of loops (often in concert with allowing or disallowing multiple edges between the same vertices):

- Where graphs are defined so as to allow loops and multiple edges, a graph without loops or multiple edges is often distinguished from other graphs by calling it a simple graph.
- Where graphs are defined so as to disallow loops and multiple edges, a graph that does have loops or multiple edges is often distinguished from the graphs that satisfy these constraints by calling it a multigraph or pseudograph.

In a graph with one vertex, all edges must be loops. Such a graph is called a bouquet.

== Degree ==
For an undirected graph, the degree of a vertex is equal to the number of adjacent vertices.

A special case is a loop, which adds two to the degree. This can be understood by letting each connection of the loop edge count as its own adjacent vertex. In other words, a vertex with a loop "sees" itself as an adjacent vertex from both ends of the edge thus adding two, not one, to the degree.

For a directed graph, a loop adds one to the in degree and one to the out degree.

== See also ==
=== In graph theory ===
- Cycle (graph theory)
- Graph theory
- Glossary of graph theory

=== In topology ===
- Möbius ladder
- Möbius strip
- Klein bottle

=== In Philosophy ===
- Strange loop
