= J. A. Todd =

British geometer

- Born: 23 August 1908; Liverpool, England
- Died: 22 December 1994 (aged 86); Croydon, England
- Education: University of Cambridge
- Known for: Todd class Todd–Coxeter algorithm Chevalley–Shephard–Todd theorem Coset enumeration Todd genus Todd polynomials
- Awards: Smith's Prize (1930); Rockefeller Fellowship (1933), Fellow of the Royal Society
- Scientific career
- Fields: Mathematician
- Workplaces: University of Manchester; University of Cambridge
- Thesis: Grassmannian Varieties / The Conic as a Space Element (1932)
- Doctoral advisor: H.F. Baker
- Doctoral students: Roger Penrose; Geoffrey Shephard; Christine Hamill

John Arthur Todd FRS (23 August 1908 – 22 December 1994) was an English mathematician who specialised in geometry.

== Biography ==
He was born in Liverpool, and went up to Trinity College, Cambridge in 1925. He did research under H.F. Baker, and in 1931 took a position at the University of Manchester. He became a lecturer at Cambridge in 1937. He remained at Cambridge for the rest of his working life.

== Work ==
The Todd class in the theory of the higher-dimensional Riemann–Roch theorem is an example of a characteristic class (or, more accurately, a reciprocal of one) that was discovered by Todd in work published in 1937. It used the methods of the Italian school of algebraic geometry. The Todd–Coxeter algorithm for coset enumeration is a major method of computational algebra, and dates from a collaboration with H.S.M. Coxeter in 1936. In 1953 he and Coxeter discovered the Coxeter–Todd lattice. In 1954 he and G. C. Shephard classified the finite complex reflection groups.

== Honours ==
In March 1948 he was elected a Fellow of the Royal Society.

== Selected publications ==
- Coxeter, H. S. M.; Todd, J. A. (1936). "A practical method for enumerating cosets of a finite abstract group". Proceedings of the Edinburgh Mathematical Society. 5 (1): 26–34. doi:10.1017/S0013091500008221.
- Babbage, D. W.; Todd, J. A. (1937). "Rational quartic primals and associated Cremona transformations of four-dimensional space". Proceedings of the London Mathematical Society. s2-42 (1): 324–339. doi:10.1112/plms/s2-42.1.324.
- Todd, J. A. (1938). "The Geometrical Invariants of Algebraic Loci". Proceedings of the London Mathematical Society. s2-43 (1): 127–138. doi:10.1112/plms/s2-43.2.127.
- Todd, J. A. (1938). "The Geometrical Invariants of Algebraic Loci". Proceedings of the London Mathematical Society. s2-43 (1): 190–225. doi:10.1112/plms/s2-43.3.190.
- Todd, J. A. (1939). "The Geometrical Invariants of Algebraic Loci". Proceedings of the London Mathematical Society. s2-45 (1): 410–424. doi:10.1112/plms/s2-45.1.410.
- Coxeter, H. S. M.; Todd, J. A. (1953). "An extreme duodenary form". Canadian Journal of Mathematics. 5: 384–392. doi:10.4153/CJM-1953-043-4.
- Shephard, G. C.; Todd, J. A. (1954). "An extreme duodenary form". Canadian Journal of Mathematics. 6: 274–304. doi:10.4153/CJM-1954-028-3.
- Atiyah, M. F.; Todd, J. A. (1960). "On complex Stiefel manifolds". Mathematical Proceedings of the Cambridge Philosophical Society. 56 (4): 342–353. doi:10.1017/S0305004100034642.
- Todd, J. A. (1966). "A representation of the Mathieu group M_{24} as a collineation group". Annali di Matematica Pura ed Applicata. 71 (4): 199–238. doi:10.1007/BF02413742.
