= Otto Schreier =

Austrian mathematician (1901–1929)

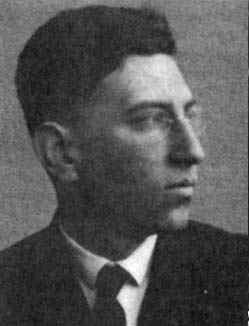
Otto Schreier

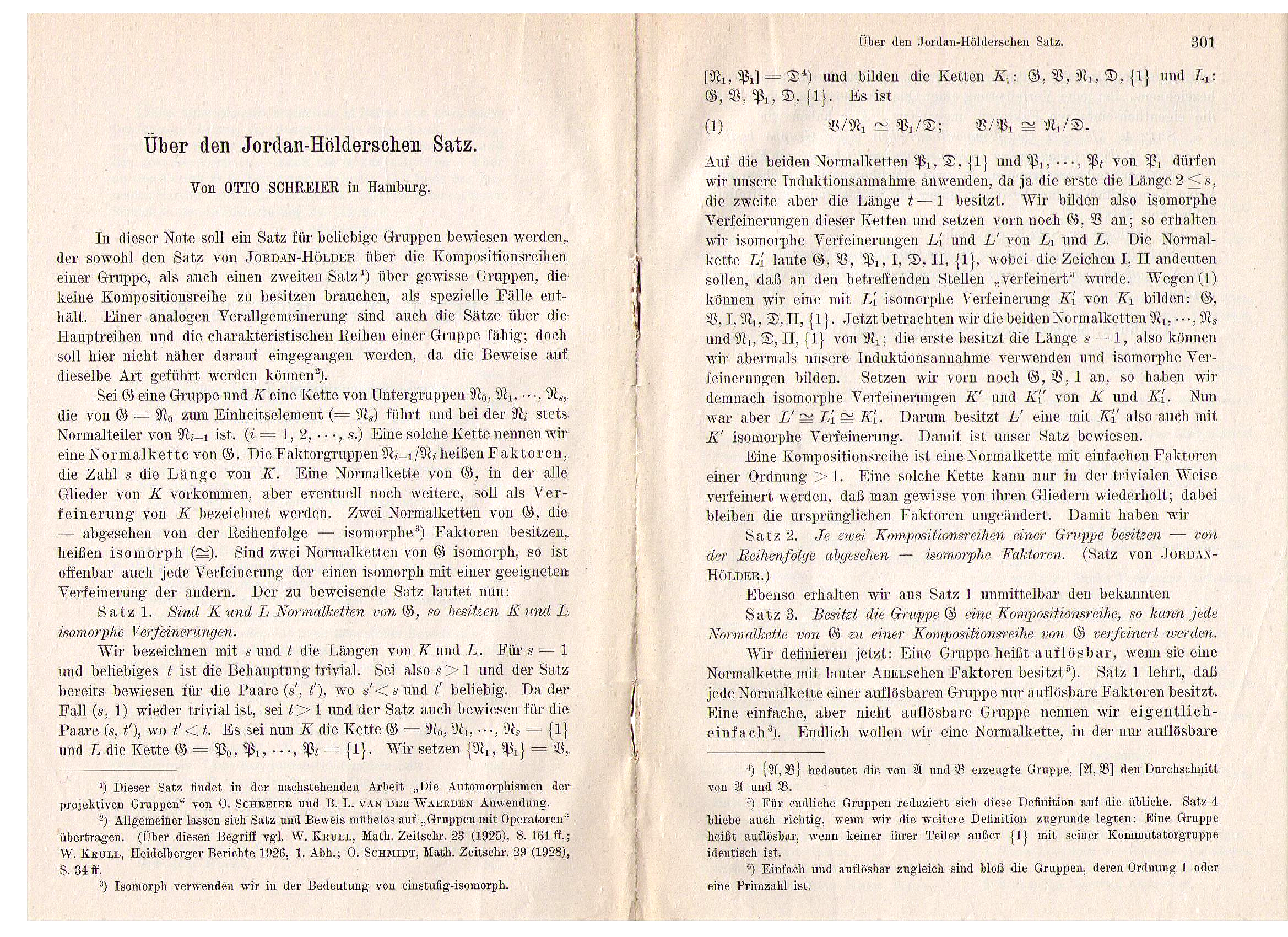
Start pages of a 1928 article of Schreier on the Jordan–Hölder theorem

Otto Schreier (3 March 1901 in Vienna, Austria – 2 June 1929 in Hamburg, Germany) was a Jewish-Austrian mathematician who made major contributions in combinatorial group theory and in the topology of Lie groups.

== Life ==
His parents were the architect Theodor Schreier (1873-1943) and his wife Anna (b. Turnau) (1878-1942). From 1920 Otto Schreier studied at the University of Vienna and took classes with Wilhelm Wirtinger, Philipp Furtwängler, Hans Hahn, Kurt Reidemeister, Leopold Vietoris, and Josef Lense. In 1923 he obtained his doctorate, under the supervision of Philipp Furtwängler, entitled On the expansion of groups (Über die Erweiterung von Gruppen). In 1926 he completed his habilitation with Emil Artin at the University of Hamburg (Die Untergruppen der freien Gruppe. Abhandlungen des Mathematischen Seminars der Universität Hamburg, Band 5, 1927, Seiten 172–179), where he had also given lectures before.

In 1928 he became a professor at the University of Rostock. He gave lectures in Hamburg and Rostock at the same time in the winter semester but fell seriously ill from sepsis in December 1928, of which he died six months later.

His daughter Irene was born a month after his death. His wife Edith (née Jacoby) and daughter were able to flee to the United States in January 1939. His daughter became a pianist and married the American mathematician Dana Scott (born 1932), whom she had met in Princeton. Otto Schreier's parents died in the Theresienstadt concentration camp during the Holocaust.

== Scientific contributions ==
Schreier was introduced to group theory by Kurt Reidemeister and first examined knot groups in 1924 following work by Max Dehn. His best-known work is his habilitation thesis on the subgroups of free groups, in which he generalizes the results of Reidemeister about normal subgroups. He proved that subgroups of free groups themselves are free, generalizing a theorem by Jakob Nielsen (1921).

In 1927 he showed that the topological fundamental group of a classical Lie group is abelian. In 1928 he improved Jordan-Hölder's theorem. With Emil Artin, he proved the Artin-Schreier theorem characterizing Real closed fields.

The Schreier conjecture of group theory states that the group of external automorphisms of any finite simple group is solvable (the conjecture follows from the classification theorem of finite simple groups, which is generally accepted).

With Emanuel Sperner, he wrote an introductory textbook on linear algebra, which was well-known in German-speaking countries for a long time. A second edition of Introduction to Modern Algebra and Matrix Theory has been republished by Dover.

== Significance of the Artin–Schreier theorem ==
According to Hans Zassenhaus:

O. Schreier's and Artin's ingenious characterization of formally real fields as fields in which –1 is not the sum of squares and the ensuing deduction of the existence of an algebraic ordering of such fields started the discipline of real algebra. Really, Artin and his congenial friend and colleague Schreier set out on the daring and successful construction of a bridge between algebra and analysis. In the light of Artin-Schreier's theory the fundamental theorem of algebra truly is an algebraic theorem inasmuch as it states that irreducible polynomials over real closed fields only can be linear or quadratic.

== Results and concepts named after Otto Schreier ==
- Nielsen–Schreier theorem
- Schreier refinement theorem
- Artin–Schreier theorem
- Artin–Schreier theory
- Schreier's subgroup lemma
- Schreier–Sims algorithm
- Schreier coset graph
- Schreier conjecture
- Schreier domain
