= Subgroups of cyclic groups =

Concept in abstract algebra

In abstract algebra, every subgroup of a cyclic group is cyclic. Moreover, for a finite cyclic group of order n, every subgroup's order is a divisor of n, and there is exactly one subgroup for each divisor. This result has been called the fundamental theorem of cyclic groups.

== Finite cyclic groups ==
For every finite group G of order n, the following statements are equivalent:

- G is cyclic.
- For every divisor d of n, G has at most one subgroup of order d.

If either (and thus both) are true, it follows that there exists exactly one subgroup of order d, for any divisor of n. This statement is known by various names such as characterization by subgroups. (See also cyclic group for some characterization.)

There exist finite groups other than cyclic groups with the property that all proper subgroups are cyclic; the Klein group is an example. However, the Klein group has more than one subgroup of order 2, so it does not meet the conditions of the characterization.

== The infinite cyclic group ==
The infinite cyclic group is isomorphic to the additive subgroup Z of the integers. There is one subgroup dZ for each integer d (consisting of the multiples of d), and with the exception of the trivial group (generated by d = 0) every such subgroup is itself an infinite cyclic group. Because the infinite cyclic group is a free group on one generator (and the trivial group is a free group on no generators), this result can be seen as a special case of the Nielsen–Schreier theorem that every subgroup of a free group is itself free.

The fundamental theorem for finite cyclic groups can be established from the same theorem for the infinite cyclic groups, by viewing each finite cyclic group as a quotient group of the infinite cyclic group.

== Lattice of subgroups ==
In both the finite and the infinite case, the lattice of subgroups of a cyclic group is isomorphic to the dual of a divisibility lattice. In the finite case, the lattice of subgroups of a cyclic group of order n is isomorphic to the dual of the lattice of divisors of n, with a subgroup of order n/d for each divisor d. The subgroup of order n/d is a subgroup of the subgroup of order n/e if and only if e is a divisor of d. The lattice of subgroups of the infinite cyclic group can be described in the same way, as the dual of the divisibility lattice of all positive integers. If the infinite cyclic group is represented as the additive group on the integers, then the subgroup generated by d is a subgroup of the subgroup generated by e if and only if e is a divisor of d.

Divisibility lattices are distributive lattices, and therefore so are the lattices of subgroups of cyclic groups. This provides another alternative characterization of the finite cyclic groups: they are exactly the finite groups whose lattices of subgroups are distributive. More generally, a finitely generated group is cyclic if and only if its lattice of subgroups is distributive and an arbitrary group is locally cyclic if and only its lattice of subgroups is distributive. The additive group of the rational numbers provides an example of a group that is locally cyclic, and that has a distributive lattice of subgroups, but that is not itself cyclic.
