= Combinatorial data analysis =

In statistics, combinatorial data analysis (CDA) is the study of data sets where the order in which objects are arranged is important. CDA can be used either to determine how well a given combinatorial construct reflects the observed data, or to search for a suitable combinatorial construct that does fit the data.

== See also ==
- Cluster analysis
- Geometric data analysis
- Structured data analysis (statistics)
- Seriation (statistics)
