= Seriation (statistics) =

In combinatorial data analysis, seriation is the process of finding an arrangement of all objects in a set, in a linear order, given a loss function. The main goal is exploratory, to reveal structural information.
