= Geometric data analysis =

Field of geometry and statistics

Geometric data analysis comprises geometric aspects of image analysis, pattern analysis, and shape analysis, and the approach of multivariate statistics, which treat arbitrary data sets as clouds of points in a space that is n-dimensional. This includes topological data analysis, cluster analysis, inductive data analysis, correspondence analysis, multiple correspondence analysis, principal components analysis and iconography of correlations.

== See also ==
- Algebraic statistics for algebraic-geometry in statistics
- Combinatorial data analysis
- Computational anatomy for the study of shapes and forms at the morphome scale
- Structured data analysis (statistics)
