= Conjugacy class sum =

In abstract algebra, a conjugacy class sum, or simply class sum, is a function defined for each conjugacy class of a finite group G as the sum of the elements in that conjugacy class. The class sums of a group form a basis for the center of the associated group algebra.

== Definition ==
Let G be a finite group, and let C_{1},...,C_{k} be the distinct conjugacy classes of G. For 1 ≤ i ≤ k, define
$$\overline{C_i}=\sum_{g\in C_i}g.$$
The functions $\overline{C_1},\ldots,\overline{C_k}$ are the class sums of G.

== In the group algebra ==
Let CG be the complex group algebra over G. Then the center of CG, denoted Z(CG), is defined by
$$\operatorname{Z}(\mathbf{C}G) = \{f \in \mathbf{C}G \mid \forall g\in \mathbf{C}G, fg = gf \}.$$

This is equal to the set of all class functions (functions which are constant on conjugacy classes). To see this, note that f is central if and only if f(yx) = f(xy) for all x,y in G. Replacing y by yx^{−1}, this condition becomes
$$f(xyx^{-1})=f(y) \text{ for } x,y \in G.$$

The class sums are a basis for the set of all class functions, and thus they are a basis for the center of the algebra.

In particular, this shows that the dimension of Z(CG) is equal to the number of class sums of G.
