= Place-permutation action =

In mathematics, there are two natural interpretations of the place-permutation action of symmetric groups, in which the group elements act on positions or places. Each may be regarded as either a left or a right action, depending on the order in which one chooses to compose permutations. There are just two interpretations of the meaning of "acting by a permutation $\sigma$" but these lead to four variations, depending whether maps are written on the left or right of their arguments. The presence of so many variations often leads to confusion. When regarding the group algebra of a symmetric group as a diagram algebra it is natural to write maps on the right so as to compute compositions of diagrams from left to right.

== Maps written on the left ==
First we assume that maps are written on the left of their arguments, so that compositions take place from right to left. Let $\mathfrak{S}_n$ be the symmetric group on $n$ letters, with compositions computed from right to left.

Imagine a situation in which elements of $\mathfrak{S}_n$ act on the “places” (i.e., positions) of something. The places could be vertices of a regular polygon of $n$ sides, the tensor positions of a simple tensor, or even the inputs of a polynomial of $n$ variables. So we have $n$ places, numbered in order from 1 to $n$, occupied by $n$ objects that we can number $x_1, \dots, x_n$. In short, we can regard our items as a word $x = x_1 \cdots x_n$ of length $n$ in which the position of each element is significant. Now what does it mean to act by “place-permutation” on $x$? There are two possible answers:

1. an element $\sigma \in \mathfrak{S}_n$ can move the item in the $j$th place to the $\sigma(j)$th place, or
2. it can do the opposite, moving an item from the $\sigma(j)$th place to the $j$th place.

Each of these interpretations of the meaning of an “action” by $\sigma$ (on the places) is equally natural, and both are widely used by mathematicians. Thus, when encountering an instance of a "place-permutation" action one must take care to determine from the context which interpretation is intended, if the author does not give specific formulas.

Consider the first interpretation. The following descriptions are all equivalent ways to describe the rule for the first interpretation of the action:

- For each $j$, move the item in the $j$th place to the $\sigma(j)$th place.
- For each $j$, move the item in the $\sigma^{-1}(j)$th place to the $j$th place.
- For each $j$, replace the item in the $j$th position by the one that was in the $\sigma^{-1}(j)$th place.

This action may be written as the rule $x_1 \cdots x_n \overset{\sigma} {\longrightarrow} x_{\sigma^{-1}(1)} \cdots x_{\sigma^{-1}(n)}$.

Now if we act on this by another permutation $\tau$ then we need to first relabel the items by writing $y_1 \cdots y_n = x_{\sigma^{-1}(1)}\cdots x_{\sigma^{-1}(n)}$. Then $\tau$ takes this to $y_{\tau^{-1}(1)} \cdots y_{\tau^{-1}(n)} = x_{\sigma^{-1} \tau^{-1}(1)} \cdots x_{\sigma^{-1} \tau^{-1}(n)} = x_{(\tau\sigma)^{-1}(1)} \cdots x_{(\tau\sigma)^{-1}(n)}.$ This proves that the action is a left action: $\tau \cdot (\sigma \cdot x) = (\tau \sigma) \cdot x$.

Now we consider the second interpretation of the action of $\sigma$, which is the opposite of the first. The following descriptions of the second interpretation are all equivalent:

- For each $j$, move the item in the $j$th place to the $\sigma^{-1}(j)$th place.
- For each $j$, move the item in the $\sigma(j)$th place to the $j$th place.
- For each $j$, replace the item in the $j$th position by the one that was in the $\sigma(j)$th place.

This action may be written as the rule $x_1 \cdots x_n \overset{\sigma} {\longrightarrow} x_{\sigma(1)} \cdots x_{\sigma(n)}$.

In order to act on this by another permutation $\tau$, again we first relabel the items by writing $y_1 \cdots y_n = x_{\sigma(1)} \cdots x_{\sigma(n)}$. Then the action of $\tau$ takes this to $y_{\tau(1)} \cdots y_{\tau(n)} = x_{\sigma \tau(1)} \cdots x_{\sigma \tau(n)} = x_{(\sigma\tau)(1)} \cdots x_{(\sigma\tau)(n)}.$ This proves that our second interpretation of the action is a right action: $(x \cdot \sigma) \cdot \tau = x \cdot (\sigma \tau)$.

=== Example ===
If $\sigma = (1,2,3)$ is the 3-cycle $1 \to 2 \to 3 \to 1$ and $\tau = (1,3)$ is the transposition $1 \to 3 \to 1$, then since we write maps on the left of their arguments we have $\sigma \tau = (1,2,3)(1,3) = (2,3), \quad \tau \sigma = (1,3)(1,2,3) = (1,2).$ Using the first interpretation we have $x=x_1 x_2 x_3 \overset{\sigma} {\longrightarrow} x_3 x_1 x_2 \overset{\tau} {\longrightarrow} x_2 x_1 x_3$, the result of which agrees with the action of $\tau \sigma = (1,2)$ on $x=x_1 x_2 x_3$. So $\tau \cdot (\sigma \cdot x) = (\tau\sigma) \cdot x$.

On the other hand, if we use the second interpretation, we have $x=x_1 x_2 x_3 \overset{\sigma} {\longrightarrow} x_2 x_3 x_1 \overset{\tau} {\longrightarrow} x_1 x_3 x_2$, the result of which agrees with the action of $\sigma \tau = (2,3)$ on $x=x_1 x_2 x_3$. So $(x \cdot \sigma)\cdot \tau = x \cdot (\sigma\tau)$.

== Maps written on the right ==
Sometimes people like to write maps on the right of their arguments. This is a convenient convention to adopt when working with symmetric groups as diagram algebras, for instance, since then one may read compositions from left to right instead of from right to left. The question is: how does this affect the two interpretations of the place-permutation action of a symmetric group?

The answer is simple. By writing maps on the right instead of on the left we are reversing the order of composition, so in effect we replace $\mathfrak{S}_n$ by its opposite group $\mathfrak{S}_n^{\text{op}}$. This is the same group, but the order of compositions is reversed.

Reversing the order of compositions evidently changes left actions into right ones, and vice versa, changes right actions into left ones. This means that our first interpretation becomes a right action while the second becomes a left one.

In symbols, this means that the action $x_1\cdots x_n \overset{\sigma}{\longrightarrow} x_{1\sigma^{-1}}\cdots x_{n\sigma^{-1}}$ is now a right action, while the action $x_1\cdots x_n \overset{\sigma}{\longrightarrow} x_{1\sigma}\cdots x_{n\sigma}$ is now a left action.

=== Example ===
We let $\sigma = (1,2,3)$ be the 3-cycle $1 \to 2 \to 3 \to 1$ and $\tau = (1,3)$ the transposition $1 \to 3 \to 1$, as before. Since we now write maps on the right of their arguments we have $\sigma \tau = (1,2,3)(1,3) = (1,2), \quad \tau \sigma = (1,3)(1,2,3) = (2,3).$ Using the first interpretation we have $x=x_1 x_2 x_3 \overset{\sigma} {\longrightarrow} x_3 x_1 x_2 \overset{\tau} {\longrightarrow} x_2 x_1 x_3$, the result of which agrees with the action of $\sigma \tau = (1,2)$ on $x=x_1 x_2 x_3$. So $(x \cdot \sigma)\cdot \tau = x \cdot (\sigma\tau)$.

On the other hand, if we use the second interpretation, we have $x=x_1 x_2 x_3 \overset{\sigma} {\longrightarrow} x_2 x_3 x_1 \overset{\tau} {\longrightarrow} x_1 x_3 x_2$, the result of which agrees with the action of $\tau\sigma = (2,3)$ on $x=x_1 x_2 x_3$. So $\tau \cdot (\sigma \cdot x) = (\tau\sigma) \cdot x$.

== Summary ==
In conclusion, we summarize the four possibilities considered in this article. Here are the four variations:

Rule	Type of action
$x_1 \cdots x_n \overset{\sigma} {\longrightarrow} x_{\sigma^{-1}(1)} \cdots x_{\sigma^{-1}(n)}$	left action
$x_1 \cdots x_n \overset{\sigma} {\longrightarrow} x_{\sigma(1)} \cdots x_{\sigma(n)}$	right action
$x_1 \cdots x_n \overset{\sigma} {\longrightarrow} x_{1\sigma^{-1}} \cdots x_{n\sigma^{-1}}$	right action
$x_1 \cdots x_n \overset{\sigma} {\longrightarrow} x_{1\sigma} \cdots x_{n\sigma}$	left action

Although there are four variations, there are still only two different ways of acting; the four variations arise from the choice of writing maps on the left or right, a choice which is purely a matter of convention.
