= Topological graph =

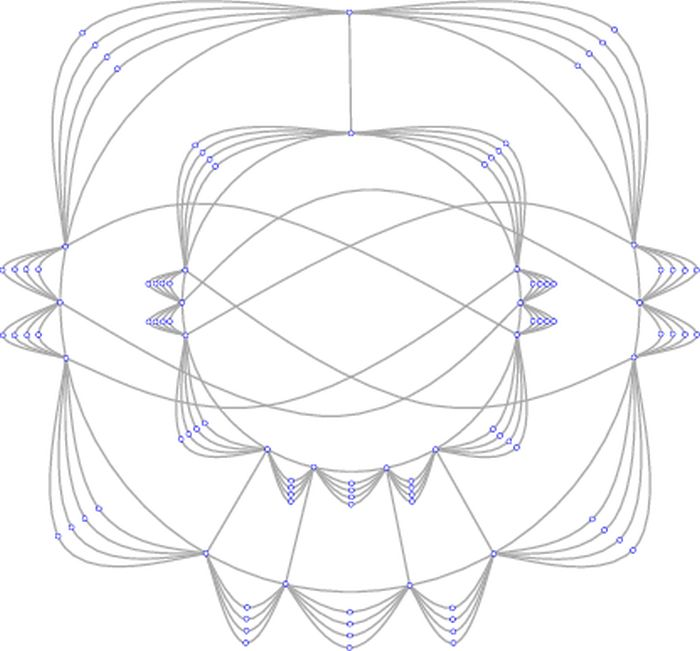
A graph with odd-crossing number 13 and pair-crossing number 15

In mathematics, a topological graph is a representation of a graph in the plane, where the vertices of the graph are represented by distinct points and the edges by Jordan arcs (connected pieces of Jordan curves) joining the corresponding pairs of points. The points representing the vertices of a graph and the arcs representing its edges are called the vertices and the edges of the topological graph. It is usually assumed that any two edges of a topological graph cross a finite number of times, no edge passes through a vertex different from its endpoints, and no two edges touch each other (without crossing). A topological graph is also called a drawing of a graph.

An important special class of topological graphs is the class of geometric graphs, where the edges are represented by line segments. (The term geometric graph is sometimes used in a broader, somewhat vague sense.)

The theory of topological graphs is an area of graph theory, mainly concerned with combinatorial properties of topological graphs, in particular, with the crossing patterns of their edges. It is closely related to graph drawing, a field which is more application oriented, and topological graph theory, which focuses on embeddings of graphs in surfaces (that is, drawings without crossings).

== Extremal problems for topological graphs ==
A fundamental problem in extremal graph theory is the following: what is the maximum number of edges that a graph of n vertices can have if it contains no subgraph belonging to a given class of forbidden subgraphs? The prototype of such results is Turán's theorem, where there is one forbidden subgraph: a complete graph with k vertices (k is fixed). Analogous questions can be raised for topological and geometric graphs, with the difference that now certain geometric subconfigurations are forbidden.

Historically, the first instance of such a theorem is due to Paul Erdős, who extended a result of Heinz Hopf and Erika Pannwitz. He proved that the maximum number of edges that a geometric graph with n > 2 vertices can have without containing two disjoint edges (that cannot even share an endpoint) is n. John Conway conjectured that this statement can be generalized to simple topological graphs. A topological graph is called "simple" if any pair of its edges share at most one point, which is either an endpoint or a common interior point at which the two edges properly cross. Conway's thrackle conjecture can now be reformulated as follows: A simple topological graph with n > 2 vertices and no two disjoint edges has at most n edges.

The first linear upper bound on the number of edges of such a graph was established by Lovász et al. The best known upper bound, 1.3984n, was proved by Fulek and Pach. Apart from geometric graphs, Conway's thrackle conjecture is known to be true for x-monotone topological graphs. A topological graph is said to be x-monotone if every vertical line intersects every edge in at most one point.

Alon and Erdős initiated the investigation of the generalization of the above question to the case where the forbidden configuration consists of k disjoint edges (k > 2). They proved that the number of edges of a geometric graph of n vertices, containing no 3 disjoint edges is O(n). The optimal bound of roughly 2.5n was determined by Černý. For larger values of k, the first linear upper bound, $O(k^4n)$, was established by Pach and Töröcsik. This was improved by Tóth to $O(k^2n)$. For the number of edges in a simple topological graph with no k disjoint edges, only an $O(n\log^{4k-8} n)$ upper bound is known. This implies that every complete simple topological graph with n vertices has at least $c\frac{\log n}{\log \log n}$ pairwise disjoint edges, which was improved to $cn^{\frac 12-\epsilon}$ by Ruiz-Vargas. It is possible that this lower bound can be further improved to cn, where c > 0 is a constant.

=== Quasi-planar graphs ===
A common interior point of two edges, at which the first edge passes from one side of the second edge to the other, is called a crossing. Two edges of a topological graph cross each other if they determine a crossing. For any integer k > 1, a topological or geometric graph is called k-quasi-planar if it has no k pairwise crossing edges. Using this terminology, if a topological graph is 2-quasi-planar, then it is a planar graph. It follows from Euler's polyhedral formula that every planar graph with n > 2 vertices has at most 3n − 6 edges. Therefore, every 2-quasi-planar graph with n > 2 vertices has at most 3n − 6 edges.

It has been conjectured by Pach et al. that every k-quasi-planar topological graph with n vertices has at most c(k)n edges, where c(k) is a constant depending only on k. This conjecture is known to be true for k = 3 and k = 4. It is also known to be true for convex geometric graphs (that is for geometric graphs whose vertices form the vertex set of a convex n-gon), and for k-quasi-planar topological graphs whose edges are drawn as x-monotone curves, all of which cross a vertical line. The last result implies that every k-quasi-planar topological graph with n vertices, whose edges are drawn as x-monotone curves has at most c(k)n log n edges for a suitable constant c(k). For geometric graphs, this was proved earlier by Valtr. The best known general upper bound for the number of edges of a k-quasi-planar topological graph is $n\log^{O(\log k)}n$. This implies that every complete topological graph with n vertices has at least $n^{\frac{1}{O(\log \log n)}}$pairwise crossing edges, which was improved to a quasi linear bound in the case of geometric graph.

== Crossing numbers ==
Ever since Pál Turán coined his brick factory problem during World War II, the determination or estimation of crossing numbers of graphs has been a popular theme in graph theory and in the theory of algorithms that is abundant with famous long standing open problems such as the Albertson conjecture, Harary-Hill's conjecture or the still unsolved Turán's brick factory problem. However, the publications in the subject (explicitly or implicitly) used several competing definitions of crossing numbers. This was pointed out by Pach and Tóth, who introduced the following terminology.

Crossing number (of a graph G): The minimum number of crossing points over all drawings of G in the plane (that is, all of its representations as a topological graph) with the property that no three edges pass through the same point. It is denoted by cr(G).

Pair-crossing number: The minimum number of crossing pairs of edges over all drawings of G. It is denoted by pair-cr(G).

Odd-crossing number: The minimum number of those pairs of edges that cross an odd number of times, over all drawings of G. It is denoted by odd-cr(G).

These parameters are not unrelated. One has odd-cr(G) ≤ pair-cr(G) ≤ cr(G) for every graph G. It is known that cr(G) ≤ 2(odd-cr(G))^{2} and $O(\operatorname{pcr}(G)^{\frac{3}{2}}\log^{2}\operatorname{pcr}(G))$ and that there exist infinitely many graphs for which pair-cr(G) ≠ odd-cr(G). No examples are known for which the crossing number and the pair-crossing number are not the same. It follows from the Hanani–Tutte theorem that odd-cr(G) = 0 implies cr(G) = 0. It is also known that odd-cr(G) = k implies cr(G)=k for k = 1, 2, 3. Another well researched graph parameter is the following.

Rectilinear crossing number: The minimum number of crossing points over all straight-line drawings of G in the plane (that is, all of its representations as a geometric graph) with the property that no three edges pass through the same point. It is denoted by lin-cr(G).

By definition, one has cr(G) ≤ lin-cr(G) for every graph G. It was shown by Bienstock and Dean that there are graphs with crossing number 4 and with arbitrarily large rectilinear crossing number.

Computing the crossing number is NP-complete in general. Therefore a large body of research focuses on its estimates. The Crossing Lemma is a cornerstone result that provides widely applicable lower bounds on the crossing number. Several interesting variants and generalizations of the Crossing Lemma are known for Jordan curves and degenerate crossing number, where the latter relates the notion of the crossing number to the graph genus.

== Ramsey-type problems for geometric graphs ==
In traditional graph theory, a typical Ramsey-type result states that if we color the edges of a sufficiently large complete graph with a fixed number of colors, then we necessarily find a monochromatic subgraph of a certain type. One can raise similar questions for geometric (or topological) graphs, except that now we look for monochromatic (one-colored) substructures satisfying certain geometric conditions. One of the first results of this kind states that every complete geometric graph whose edges are colored with two colors contains a non-crossing monochromatic spanning tree. It is also true that every such geometric graph contains $\left\lceil \frac{n+1}{3} \right\rceil$ disjoint edges of the same color. The existence of a non-crossing monochromatic path of size at least cn, where c > 0 is a constant, is a long-standing open problem. It is only known that every complete geometric graph on n vertices contains a non-crossing monochromatic path of length at least $n^{\frac 23}$.

== Topological hypergraphs ==
If we view a topological graph as a topological realization of a 1-dimensional simplicial complex, it is natural to ask how the above extremal and Ramsey-type problems generalize to topological realizations of d-dimensional simplicial complexes. There are some initial results in this direction, but it requires further research to identify the key notions and problems.

Two vertex disjoint simplices are said to cross if their relative interiors have a point in common. A set of k > 3 simplices strongly cross if no 2 of them share a vertex, but their relative interiors have a point common.

It is known that a set of d-dimensional simplices spanned by n points in $\mathbb{R}^d$ without a pair of crossing simplices can have at most $O(n^{d})$ simplices and this bound is asymptotically tight. This result was generalized to sets of 2-dimensional simplices in $\mathbb{R}^2$ without three strongly crossing simplices. If we forbid k strongly crossing simplices, the corresponding best known upper bound is $O(n^{d+1-\delta})$, for some $\delta =\delta (k,d)<1$. This result follows from the colored Tverberg theorem. It is far from the conjectured bound of $O(n^{d})$.

For any fixed k > 1, we can select at most $O(n^{\lceil \frac{d}{2} \rceil})$ d-dimensional simplices spanned by a set of n points in $\mathbb{R}^d$ with the property that no k of them share a common interior point. This is asymptotically tight.

Two triangles in $\mathbb{R}^3$ are said to be almost disjoint if they are disjoint or if they share only one vertex. It is an old problem of Gil Kalai and others to decide whether the largest number of almost disjoint triangles that can be chosen on some vertex set of n points in $\mathbb{R}^3$ is $o(n^2)$. It is known that there exists sets of n points for which this number is at least $cn^{\frac 32}$ for a suitable constant c > 0.
