= Nielsen transformation =

Set of mathematical functions concerning algebraic group isomorphism

In mathematics, especially in the area of modern algebra known as combinatorial group theory, Nielsen transformations are certain automorphisms of a free group which are a non-commutative analogue of row reduction and one of the main tools used in studying free groups (Fine, Rosenberger & Stille 1995).

Given a finite basis of a free group $F_n$, the corresponding set of elementary Nielsen transformations forms a finite generating set of $\mathrm{Aut}(F_n)$. This system of generators is analogous to elementary matrices for $GL_n(\Z)$ and Dehn twists for mapping class groups of closed surfaces.

Nielsen transformations were introduced in (Nielsen 1921) to prove that every subgroup of a free group is free (the Nielsen–Schreier theorem). They are now used in a variety of mathematics, including computational group theory, k-theory, and knot theory.

== Definitions ==
=== Free groups ===
Let $F_n$ be a finitely generated free group of rank $n$. An elementary Nielsen transformation maps an ordered basis $[x_1,\ldots, x_n]$ to a new basis $[y_1,\ldots,y_n]$ by one of the following operations:

1. Permute the $x_i$s by some permutation $\sigma\in S_n$, i.e. $[y_1,\ldots,y_n] = [x_{\sigma(1)},\ldots, x_{\sigma(n)}]$
2. Invert some $x_i$, i.e. $[y_1,\ldots,y_n] = [x_1,\ldots, x_i^{-1},\ldots,x_n]$
3. Replace some $x_i$ with $x_ix_j$ for some $j\ne i$, i.e. $[y_1,\ldots,y_n] = [x_1,\ldots, x_ix_j,\ldots,x_n]$.

A Nielsen transformation is a finite composition of elementary Nielsen transformations. Since automorphisms of $F_n$ are determined by the image of a basis, the elementary Nielsen transformations correspond to a finite subset of the automorphism group $\mathrm{Aut}(F_n)$, which is in fact a generating set (see below). Hence, Nielsen transformation can alternatively be defined simply as the action of an automorphism of $F_n$ on bases.

Elementary Nielsen transformations are the analogues of the elementary row operations. Transformations of the first kind are analogous to row permutations. Transformations of the second kind correspond to scaling a row by an invertible scalar. Transformations of the third kind correspond to row additions (transvections).

Since the finite permutation group $S_n$ is generated by transpositions, one sees from the chain of elementary Nielsen transformations of type 2 and 3:
$$(x_i, x_{i+1}) \mapsto {(x_i, x_{i+1}^{-1})} \mapsto {{(x_ix_{i+1}^{-1}}, x_{i+1}^{-1})} \mapsto ({{x_{i+1}x_i^{-1}}, x_{i+1}^{-1}}) \mapsto {({x_{i+1}x_i^{-1}}, x_i^{-1})} \mapsto (x_{i+1}x_i^{-1}, x_i) \mapsto (x_{i+1}, x_i)$$
that elementary Nielsen transformations of type 2 and 3 are in fact enough to generate all Nielsen transformations.

Using the two generators $(1 2)$ and $(1 \ldots n)$ of $S_n$, one can alternatively restrict attention to only four operations:

- switch $x_1$ and $x_2$
- cyclically permute the $x_i$s
- invert $x_1$
- replace $x_1$ with $x_1x_2$.

=== General finitely generated groups ===
When dealing with groups that are not free, one instead applies these transformations to finite ordered subsets of a group. In this situation, compositions of the elementary transformations are called regular. If one allows removing elements of the subset that are the identity element, then the transformation is called singular.

The image under a Nielsen transformation (elementary or not, regular or not) of a generating set of a group G is also a generating set of G. Two generating sets are called Nielsen equivalent if there is a Nielsen transformation taking one to the other (beware this is not an equivalence relation). If the generating sets have the same size, then it suffices to consider compositions of regular Nielsen transformations.

== Examples ==
The dihedral group of order 10 has two Nielsen equivalence classes of generating sets of size 2. Letting x be an element of order 2, and y being an element of order 5, the two classes of generating sets are represented by [ x, y ] and [ x, yy ], and each class has 15 distinct elements. A very important generating set of a dihedral group is the generating set from its presentation as a Coxeter group. Such a generating set for a dihedral group of order 10 consists of any pair of elements of order 2, such as [ x, xy ]. This generating set is equivalent to [ x, y ] via:

- [ x^{−1}, y ], type 3
- [ y, x^{−1} ], type 1
- [ y^{−1}, x^{−1} ], type 3
- [ y^{−1}x^{−1}, x^{−1} ], type 4
- [ xy, x^{−1} ], type 3
- [ x^{−1}, xy ], type 1
- [ x, xy ], type 3

Unlike [ x, y ] and [ x, yy ], the generating sets [ x, y, 1 ] and [ x, yy, 1 ] are equivalent. A transforming sequence using more convenient elementary transformations (all swaps, all inverses, all products) is:

- [ x, y, 1 ]
- [ x, y, y ], multiply 2nd generator into 3rd
- [ x, yy, y ], multiply 3rd generator into 2nd
- [ x, yy, yyy ], multiply 2nd generator into 3rd
- [ x, yy, 1 ], multiply 2nd generator into 3rd

== Applications ==
=== Nielsen–Schreier theorem ===
The Nielsen-Schreier theorem states that every subgroup $F' \le F$ of a free group $F$ is also free. The modern proof relies on the fact that a group (finitely generated or not) is free, if and only if it is the fundamental group of a graph (finite or not). This allows one to explicitly find a basis of $F'$, since it is geometrically realized as the fundamental group of a covering of a graph whose fundamental group is $F$.

However, the original proof by Nielsen for the case of finitely generated subgroups, given in (Nielsen 1921), is different and more combinatorial. It relies on the notion of a Nielsen reduced generating set, which roughly means one for which there is not too much cancellation in products. The paper shows that every finite generating set of a subgroup of a free group is (singularly) Nielsen equivalent to a Nielsen reduced generating set, and that a Nielsen reduced generating set is a free basis for the subgroup, so the subgroup is free. This proof is given in some detail in (Magnus, Karrass & Solitar 2004, Ch 3.2).

=== Automorphism groups ===
In (Nielsen 1924), it is shown that the elementary Nielsen transformations generate the full automorphism group of a finitely generated free group. Nielsen, and later Bernhard Neumann used these ideas to give finite presentations of the automorphism groups of free groups. This is also described in standard textbooks such as (Magnus, Karrass & Solitar 2004, p. 131, Th 3.2).

For a given generating set of a finitely generated group, it is not necessarily true that every automorphism is a Nielsen transformation, but for every automorphism, there is a generating set where the automorphism is given by a Nielsen transformation, (Rapaport 1959).

The adequate generalization of Nielsen transformations for automorphisms of free products of freely indecomposable groups are Whitehead automorphisms. Together with the automorphisms of the Grushko factors, they form a generating set of the automorphism group of any finitely generated group, known as the Fouxe-Rabinovitch generators.

=== Word problem ===
A particularly simple case of the word problem for groups and the isomorphism problem for groups asks if a finitely presented group is the trivial group. This is known to be intractable in general, even though there is a finite sequence of elementary Tietze transformations taking the presentation to the trivial presentation if and only if the group is trivial. A special case is that of "balanced presentations", those finite presentations with equal numbers of generators and relators. For these groups, there is a conjecture that the required transformations are quite a bit simpler (in particular, do not involve adding or removing relators). If one allows taking the set of relators to any Nielsen equivalent set, and one allows conjugating the relators, then one gets an equivalence relation on ordered subsets of a relators of a finitely presented group. The Andrews–Curtis conjecture is that the relators of any balanced presentation of the trivial group are equivalent to a set of trivial relators, stating that each generator is the identity element.

In the textbook (Magnus, Karrass & Solitar 2004, pp. 131–132), an application of Nielsen transformations is given to solve the generalized word problem for free groups, also known as the membership problem for subgroups given by finite generating sets in free groups.

=== Isomorphism problem ===
A particularly important special case of the isomorphism problem for groups concerns the fundamental groups of three-dimensional knots, which can be solved using Nielsen transformations and a method of J. W. Alexander (Magnus, Karrass & Solitar 2004, Ch 3.4).

=== Product replacement algorithm ===
In computational group theory, it is important to generate random elements of a finite group. Popular methods of doing this apply Markov chain methods to generate random generating sets of the group. The "product replacement algorithm" simply uses randomly chosen Nielsen transformations in order to take a random walk on the graph of generating sets of the group. The algorithm is well studied, and survey is given in (Pak 2001). One version of the algorithm, called "shake", is:

- Take any ordered generating set and append some copies of the identity element, so that there are n elements in the set
- Repeat the following for a certain number of times (called a burn in)
  - Choose integers i and j uniformly at random from 1 to n, and choose e uniformly at random from { 1, -1 }
  - Replace the ith generator with the product of the ith generator and the jth generator raised to the eth power
- Every time a new random element is desired, repeat the previous two steps, then return one of the generating elements as the desired random element

The generating set used during the course of this algorithm can be proved to vary uniformly over all Nielsen equivalent generating sets. However, this algorithm has a number of statistical and theoretical problems. For instance, there can be more than one Nielsen equivalence class of generators. Also, the elements of generating sets need be uniformly distributed (for instance, elements of the Frattini subgroup can never occur in a generating set of minimal size, but more subtle problems occur too).

Most of these problems are quickly remedied in the following modification called "rattle", (Leedham-Green & Murray 2002):

- In addition to the generating set, store an additional element of the group, initialized to the identity
- Every time a generator is replaced, choose k uniformly at random, and replace the additional element by the product of the additional element with the kth generator.

=== K-theory ===
To understand Nielsen equivalence of non-minimal generating sets, module theoretic investigations have been useful, as in (Evans 1989). Continuing in these lines, a K-theoretic formulation of the obstruction to Nielsen equivalence was described in (Lustig 1991) and (Lustig & Moriah 1993). These show an important connection between the Whitehead group of the group ring and the Nielsen equivalence classes of generators.

== See also ==
- Tietze transformation
- Automorphism group of a free group
