= Strong generating set =

In abstract algebra, especially in the area of group theory, a strong generating set of a permutation group is a generating set that clearly exhibits the permutation structure as described by a stabilizer chain. A stabilizer chain is a sequence of subgroups, each containing the next and each stabilizing one more point.

Let $G \leq S_n$ be a group of permutations of the set $\{ 1, 2, \ldots, n \}.$ Let

$$B = (\beta_1, \beta_2, \ldots, \beta_r)$$

be a sequence of distinct integers, $\beta_i \in \{ 1, 2, \ldots, n \} ,$ such that the pointwise stabilizer of $B$ is trivial (i.e., let $B$ be a base for $G$). Define

$$B_i = (\beta_1, \beta_2, \ldots, \beta_i),\,$$

and define $G^{(i)}$ to be the pointwise stabilizer of $B_i$. A strong generating set (SGS) for G relative to the base $B$ is a set

$$S \subseteq G$$

such that

$$\langle S \cap G^{(i)} \rangle = G^{(i)}$$

for each $i$ such that $1 \leq i \leq r$.

The base and the SGS are said to be non-redundant if

$$G^{(i)} \neq G^{(j)}$$

for $i \neq j$.

A base and strong generating set (BSGS) for a group can be computed using the Schreier–Sims algorithm.
