= Schreier's lemma =

Theorem in group theory

In group theory, Schreier's lemma is a theorem used in the Schreier–Sims algorithm and also for finding a presentation of a subgroup.

== Statement ==
Suppose $H$ is a subgroup of $G$ with generating set $S$, that is, $G = \langle S\rangle$.

Let $R$ be a right transversal of $H$ in $G$ with the neutral element $e$ in $R$. In other words, let $R$ be a set containing exactly one element from each right coset of $H$ in $G$.

For each $g\in G$, we define $\overline{g}$ as the chosen representative of the coset $Hg$ in the transversal $R$.

Then $H$ is generated by the set

$\{rs(\overline{rs})^{-1}|r\in R, s\in S\}$.

Hence, in particular, Schreier's lemma implies that every subgroup of finite index of a finitely generated group is again finitely generated.

== Example ==
The group $\mathbb{Z}_3 = \mathbb{Z}\,/\,3 \mathbb{Z}$ is cyclic. Via Cayley's theorem, $\mathbb{Z}_3$ is isomorphic to a subgroup of the symmetric group $S_3$. Now,

$$\mathbb{Z}_3 = \{ e, (1\ 2\ 3), (1\ 3\ 2) \}$$
$$S_3 = \{ e, (1\ 2), (1\ 3), (2\ 3), (1\ 2\ 3), (1\ 3\ 2) \}$$

where $e$ is the identity permutation. Note that $S_3$ is generated by $S = \{ s_1 = (1\ 2),\, s_2 = (1\ 2\ 3) \}$.

$\mathbb{Z}_3$ has just two right cosets in $S_3$, namely $\mathbb{Z}_3$ and $S_3 \setminus \mathbb{Z}_3 = \{ (1\ 2), (1\ 3), (2\ 3)\}$, so we select the right transversal $R = \{ r_1 = e,\, r_2 = (1\ 2) \}$, and we have

$$\begin{align}
r_1s_1 &= (1\ 2),    & \text{so} && \overline{r_1s_1} &= (1\ 2) \\
r_1s_2 &= (1\ 2\ 3), & \text{so} && \overline{r_1s_2} &= e \\
r_2s_1 &= e ,        & \text{so} && \overline{r_2s_1} &= e \\
r_2s_2 &= (2\ 3),    & \text{so} && \overline{r_2s_2} &= (1\ 2). \\
\end{align}$$

Finally,

$$r_1s_1\left(\overline{r_1s_1}\right)^{-1} = e$$
$$r_1s_2\left(\overline{r_1s_2}\right)^{-1} = (1\ 2\ 3)$$
$$r_2s_1\left(\overline{r_2s_1}\right)^{-1} = e$$
$$r_2s_2\left(\overline{r_2s_2}\right)^{-1} = (1\ 2\ 3).$$

Thus, by Schreier's lemma, $\{ e, (1\ 2\ 3) \}$ generates $\mathbb{Z}_3$, but having the identity in the generating set is redundant, so it can be removed to obtain another generating set for $\mathbb{Z}_3$, $\{ (1\ 2\ 3) \}$.
