= Hale Trotter =

Canadian-American mathematician (1931–2022)

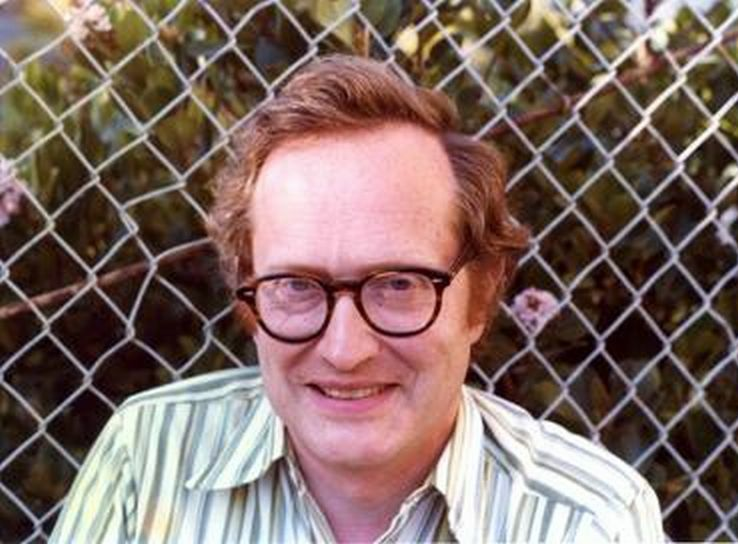
- Trotter in 1978
- Born: 30 May 1931; Kingston, Ontario, Canada
- Died: 17 January 2022 (aged 90); Princeton, New Jersey, United States
- Education: Queen's University at Kingston; Princeton University
- Known for: Lie–Trotter product formula Steinhaus–Johnson–Trotter algorithm Lang–Trotter conjecture
- Scientific career
- Fields: Mathematics
- Workplaces: Princeton University
- Doctoral advisor: William Feller

Hale Freeman Trotter (30 May 1931 – 17 January 2022) was a Canadian-American mathematician, known for the Lie–Trotter product formula, the Steinhaus–Johnson–Trotter algorithm, and the Lang–Trotter conjecture. He was born in Kingston, Ontario. He died in Princeton, New Jersey on January 17, 2022.

== Biography ==
The son of historian Reginald George Trotter, Hale Trotter studied at Queen's University in Kingston with bachelor's degree in 1952 and master's degree in 1953. He received in 1956 his PhD from Princeton University under William Feller with thesis Convergence of semigroups of operators. Trotter was from 1956 to 1958 at Princeton University the Fine Instructor for mathematics and from 1958 to 1960 an assistant professor at Queen's University. He was from 1962 to 1963 a visiting associate professor, from 1963 to 1969 an associate professor, and from 1969 until his retirement a full professor at Princeton University. From 1962 to 1986 he was an associate director for Princeton University's data center.

Trotter's research dealt with, among other topics, probability theory, group theory computations, number theory, and knot theory. In 1963, he solved an open problem in knot theory by proving that there are non-invertible knots. At the time of his proof, all knots with up to 7 crossings were known to be invertible. Trotter described an infinite number of pretzel knots that are not invertible.

== Selected publications ==
=== Articles ===
- Trotter, H. F. (1958). "A property of Brownian motion paths". Illinois Journal of Mathematics. 2 (3): 425–433. doi:10.1215/ijm/1255454547.
- Trotter, H. F. (1962). "Homology of group systems with applications to knot theory". Annals of Mathematics. 76 (3): 464–498. doi:10.2307/1970369. JSTOR 1970369.
- Goldfeld, Stephen M.; Quandt, Richard E.; Trotter, H. F. (1966). "Maximization by quadratic hill-climbing". Econometrica. 34 (3): 541–551. doi:10.2307/1909768. JSTOR 1909768.
- Trotter, H. F. (1969). "On the norms of units in quadratic fields". Proceedings of the American Mathematical Society. 22 (1): 198–201. doi:10.1090/S0002-9939-1969-0244196-6.
- Trotter, H. F. (1973). "On S-equivalence of Seifert matrices". Inventiones Mathematicae. 20 (3): 173–207. Bibcode:1973InMat..20..173T. doi:10.1007/BF01394094.
- Lang, S.; Trotter, H. F. (1977). "Primitive points on elliptic curves". Bulletin of the American Mathematical Society. 83 (2): 289–292. doi:10.1090/S0002-9904-1977-14310-3.
- Trotter, H. F. (1984). "Eigenvalue distributions of large Hermitian matrices; Wigner's semi-circle law and a theorem of Kac, Murdock, and Szegö". Advances in Mathematics. 54 (1): 67–82. doi:10.1016/0001-8708(84)90037-9.

=== Books ===
- Williamson, Richard E.; Crowell, Richard H.; Trotter, Hale F. (1972). Calculus of vector functions (Second ed.). Prentice-Hall.
- Lang, Serge; Trotter, Hale Freeman (1976). Frobenius Distributions in GL2-Extensions. Lecture Notes in Mathematics. Vol. 504. Springer Verlag. doi:10.1007/BFb0082087. ISBN 978-3-540-07550-9.
- Williamson, Richard E.; Trotter, Hale F. (1995). Multivariable Mathematics. Prentice-Hall.
