= Miklós Bóna =

Hungarian-born American mathematician

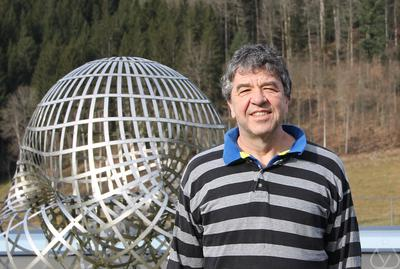
- Bóna in Oberwolfach, 2024
- Education: MIT
- Scientific career
- Fields: Mathematics
- Workplaces: University of Florida
- Thesis: Exact and Asymptotic Enumeration of Permutations with Subsequence Conditions (1997)
- Doctoral advisor: Richard P. Stanley

Miklós Bóna (born in Székesfehérvár) is an American mathematician of Hungarian origin.

Bóna completed his undergraduate studies in Budapest and Paris, then obtained his Ph.D. at MIT in 1997 as a student of Richard P. Stanley. Since 1999, he has taught at the University of Florida, where in 2010 he was inducted to the Academy of Distinguished Teaching Scholars.

Bóna's main fields of research include the combinatorics of permutations, as well as enumerative and analytic combinatorics. Since 2010, he has been one of the editors-in-chief of the Electronic Journal of Combinatorics.

== Books ==
- Miklós Bóna (2016). A Walk Through Combinatorics. Singapore: World Scientific. ISBN 978-9814460002.
- Miklós Bóna (2012). Combinatorics of Permutations. Boca Raton, Florida: CRC Press & Chapman Hall. ISBN 978-1439850510.
- Miklós Bóna (2012). Introduction to Enumerative Combinatorics. Boston: McGraw-Hill. ISBN 978-0073125619. Bona (2006). pbk 1st edition. McGraw-Hill Education (India) Pvt Limited. ISBN 978-0070616110. Bona, Miklos (2007). hbk 1st edition. McGraw-Hill Education. ISBN 978-0-07-312561-9.
- Miklós Bóna and Sergei Shabanov (2012). Concepts in Calculus. Gainesville, FL: Orange Grove Texts Plus. ISBN 978-1616101701.
- Miklós Bóna, ed. (2015). Handbook of Enumerative Combinatorics. Boca Raton, Florida: CRC Press & Chapman Hall. ISBN 9781482220858.
- Miklós Bóna (2015). Introduction to Enumerative and Analytic Combinatorics. Boca Raton, Florida: CRC Press & Chapman Hall. ISBN 978-1482249095.
