= Inversion (discrete mathematics) =

Pair of positions in a sequence where two elements are out of sorted order

Permutation with one of its inversions highlighted. An inversion may be denoted by the pair of places (2, 4) or the pair of elements (5, 2). The inversions of this permutation using element-based notation are: (3, 1), (3, 2), (5, 1), (5, 2), and (5,4).

In computer science and discrete mathematics, an inversion in a sequence is a pair of elements that are out of their natural order.

== Definitions ==
=== Inversion ===
Let $\pi$ be a permutation. There is an inversion of $\pi$ between $i$ and $j$ if $i < j$ and $\pi(i) > \pi(j)$. The inversion is indicated by an ordered pair containing either the places $(i, j)$ or the elements $\bigl(\pi(i), \pi(j)\bigr)$.

The inversion set is the set of all inversions. A permutation's inversion set using place-based notation is the same as the inverse permutation's inversion set using element-based notation with the two components of each ordered pair exchanged. Likewise, a permutation's inversion set using element-based notation is the same as the inverse permutation's inversion set using place-based notation with the two components of each ordered pair exchanged.

Inversions are usually defined for permutations, but may also be defined for sequences:
Let $S$ be a sequence (or multiset permutation). If $i < j$ and $S(i) > S(j)$, either the pair of places $(i, j)$ or the pair of elements $\bigl(S(i), S(j)\bigr)$ is called an inversion of $S$.

For sequences, inversions according to the element-based definition are not unique, because different pairs of places may have the same pair of values.

=== Inversion number ===
The inversion number $\mathtt{inv}(X)$ of a sequence $X=\langle x_1,\dots,x_n\rangle$, is the cardinality of the inversion set. It is a common measure of sortedness (sometimes called presortedness) of a permutation or sequence. The inversion number is between 0 and $\frac{n(n-1)}2$ inclusive. A permutation and its inverse have the same inversion number.

For example $\mathtt{inv}(\langle1,2,\dots, n\rangle)=0$ since the sequence is ordered. Also, when $n = 2m$ is even, $\mathtt{inv}(\langle m+1,m+2,\dots,2m,1,2,\dots, m\rangle)=m^2$ (because each pair $(1\le i\le m < j\le 2m)$ is an inversion). This last example shows that a set that is intuitively "nearly sorted" can still have a quadratic number of inversions.

The inversion number is the number of crossings in the arrow diagram of the permutation, the permutation's Kendall tau distance from the identity permutation, and the sum of each of the inversion related vectors defined below.

Other measures of sortedness include the minimum number of elements that can be deleted from the sequence to yield a fully sorted sequence, the number and lengths of sorted "runs" within the sequence, the Spearman footrule (sum of distances of each element from its sorted position), and the smallest number of exchanges needed to sort the sequence. Standard comparison sorting algorithms can be adapted to compute the inversion number in time O(n log n).

=== Inversion related vectors ===
Three similar vectors are in use that condense the inversions of a permutation into a vector that uniquely determines it. They are often called inversion vector or Lehmer code. (A list of sources is found here.)

This article uses the term inversion vector ($v$) like Wolfram. The remaining two vectors are sometimes called left and right inversion vector, but to avoid confusion with the inversion vector this article calls them left inversion count ($l$) and right inversion count ($r$). Interpreted as a factorial number the left inversion count gives the permutations reverse colexicographic, and the right inversion count gives the lexicographic index.

Rothe diagram

Inversion vector $v$:
With the element-based definition $v(i)$ is the number of inversions whose smaller (right) component is $i$.

$v(i)$ is the number of elements in $\pi$ greater than $i$ before $i$.
$$v(i) ~~=~~ \# \{ k \mid k > i ~\land~ \pi^{-1}(k) < \pi^{-1}(i) \}$$

Left inversion count $l$:
With the place-based definition $l(i)$ is the number of inversions whose bigger (right) component is $i$.

$l(i)$ is the number of elements in $\pi$ greater than $\pi(i)$ before $\pi(i)$.
$$l(i) ~~=~~ \# \left\{ k \mid k < i ~\land~ \pi(k) > \pi(i) \right\}$$

Right inversion count $r$, often called Lehmer code:
With the place-based definition $r(i)$ is the number of inversions whose smaller (left) component is $i$.

$r(i)$ is the number of elements in $\pi$ smaller than $\pi(i)$ after $\pi(i)$.
$$r(i) ~~=~~ \# \{ k \mid k > i ~\land~ \pi(k) < \pi(i) \}$$

Both $v$ and $r$ can be found with the help of a Rothe diagram, which is a permutation matrix with the 1s represented by dots, and an inversion (often represented by a cross) in every position that has a dot to the right and below it. $r(i)$ is the sum of inversions in row $i$ of the Rothe diagram, while $v(i)$ is the sum of inversions in column $i$. The permutation matrix of the inverse is the transpose, therefore $v$ of a permutation is $r$ of its inverse, and vice versa.

== Example: All permutations of four elements ==
The six possible inversions of a 4-element permutation

The following sortable table shows the 24 permutations of four elements (in the $\pi$ column) with their place-based inversion sets (in the p-b column), inversion related vectors (in the $v$, $l$, and $r$ columns), and inversion numbers (in the # column). (The columns with smaller print and no heading are reflections of the columns next to them, and can be used to sort them in colexicographic order.)

It can be seen that $v$ and $l$ always have the same digits, and that $l$ and $r$ are both related to the place-based inversion set. The nontrivial elements of $l$ are the sums of the descending diagonals of the shown triangle, and those of $r$ are the sums of the ascending diagonals. (Pairs in descending diagonals have the right components 2, 3, 4 in common, while pairs in ascending diagonals have the left components 1, 2, 3 in common.)

The default order of the table is reverse colex order by $\pi$, which is the same as colex order by $l$. Lex order by $\pi$ is the same as lex order by $r$.

3-element permutations for comparison

0
1
2
3
4
5

	$\pi$		$v$			$l$	p-b	$r$		#
0	123	321	000	000	000	000		000	000	0
1	213	312	100	001	010	010		100	001	1
2	132	231	010	010	100	001		010	010	1
3	312	213	110	011	110	011		200	002	2
4	231	132	200	002	200	002		110	011	2
5	321	123	210	012	210	012		210	012	3

0
1
2
3
4
5
6
7
8
9
10
11
12
13
14
15
16
17
18
19
20
21
22
23

	$\pi$		$v$			$l$	p-b	$r$		#
0	1234	4321	0000	0000	0000	0000		0000	0000	0
1	2134	4312	1000	0001	0010	0100		1000	0001	1
2	1324	4231	0100	0010	0100	0010		0100	0010	1
3	3124	4213	1100	0011	0110	0110		2000	0002	2
4	2314	4132	2000	0002	0200	0020		1100	0011	2
5	3214	4123	2100	0012	0210	0120		2100	0012	3
6	1243	3421	0010	0100	1000	0001		0010	0100	1
7	2143	3412	1010	0101	1010	0101		1010	0101	2
8	1423	3241	0110	0110	1100	0011		0200	0020	2
9	4123	3214	1110	0111	1110	0111		3000	0003	3
10	2413	3142	2010	0102	1200	0021		1200	0021	3
11	4213	3124	2110	0112	1210	0121		3100	0013	4
12	1342	2431	0200	0020	2000	0002		0110	0110	2
13	3142	2413	1200	0021	2010	0102		2010	0102	3
14	1432	2341	0210	0120	2100	0012		0210	0120	3
15	4132	2314	1210	0121	2110	0112		3010	0103	4
16	3412	2143	2200	0022	2200	0022		2200	0022	4
17	4312	2134	2210	0122	2210	0122		3200	0023	5
18	2341	1432	3000	0003	3000	0003		1110	0111	3
19	3241	1423	3100	0013	3010	0103		2110	0112	4
20	2431	1342	3010	0103	3100	0013		1210	0121	4
21	4231	1324	3110	0113	3110	0113		3110	0113	5
22	3421	1243	3200	0023	3200	0023		2210	0122	5
23	4321	1234	3210	0123	3210	0123		3210	0123	6

== Weak order of permutations ==
Permutohedron of the symmetric group S_{4}

The set of permutations on n items can be given the structure of a partial order, called the weak order of permutations, which forms a lattice.

The Hasse diagram of the inversion sets ordered by the subset relation forms the skeleton of a permutohedron.

If a permutation is assigned to each inversion set using the place-based definition, the resulting order of permutations is that of the permutohedron, where an edge corresponds to the swapping of two elements with consecutive values. This is the weak order of permutations. The identity is its minimum, and the permutation formed by reversing the identity is its maximum.

If a permutation were assigned to each inversion set using the element-based definition, the resulting order of permutations would be that of a Cayley graph, where an edge corresponds to the swapping of two elements on consecutive places. This Cayley graph of the symmetric group is similar to its permutohedron, but with each permutation replaced by its inverse.

== See also ==
- Factorial number system
- Permutation graph
- Damerau–Levenshtein distance
- Parity of a permutation

Sequences in the OEIS:

- Sequences related to factorial base representation
- Factorial numbers: A007623 and A108731
- Inversion numbers: A034968
- Inversion sets of finite permutations interpreted as binary numbers: A211362 (related permutation: A211363)
- Finite permutations that have only 0s and 1s in their inversion vectors: A059590 (their inversion sets: A211364)
- Number of permutations of n elements with k inversions; Mahonian numbers: A008302 (their row maxima; Kendall-Mann numbers: A000140)
- Number of connected labeled graphs with n edges and n nodes: A057500
