= Null function =

Type of subroutine in computer science

In computer science, a null function (or null operator) is a subroutine that leaves the program state unchanged. When it is part of the instruction set of a processor, it is called a NOP or NOOP (No OPeration).

Mathematically, a (computer) function $f$ is null if and only if its execution leaves the program state $s$ unchanged. That is, a null function is an identity function whose domain and codomain are both the state space $S$ of the program, and for which:

$$f(s)=s$$

for all elements $s \in S$.

Less rigorous definitions may also be encountered. For example, a function may take a single operand, transform it into a new data type, and return the result. While such usages bear a strong visual resemblance to identity functions, they create or alter a binary data value and thus change the program state. From a software maintainability perspective it is better to identify such "minor" alternations of state explicitly, since calling them null functions provides future maintainers of the code with no insights on their actual purposes.

== Uses ==
Null functions have several uses.

During software development, null functions with the same names and type signatures as a planned functions are often used as stubs—that is, as non-functional placeholders that allow the incomplete body of code to be compiled and tested prior to completion of all planned features.

Null functions, particularly the NOP variety, are also used to provide delays of indeterminate length within wait loops. This is a common strategy in dedicated device controllers that must wait for an external input and have no other tasks to perform while they are waiting. Such wait loops are also used in software applications on larger multiprocessing computer systems. However, for multiprocessing systems a better approach is to use operating system functions that let other processes use the CPU during the waiting period.

A third use of null functions is as the definition of a program feature that, if created inadvertently, is almost always deleterious. Unintended null functions can arise during the development of complex programs, and like dead code, such occurrences indicate serious flaws in program structures.

A null function or method is often used as the default behavior of a revectorable function or overrideable method in an object framework.

== See also ==
- IEFBR14
