= Glossary of algebraic topology =

Mathematics glossary

This is a glossary of properties and concepts in algebraic topology in mathematics.

See also: glossary of topology, list of algebraic topology topics, glossary of category theory, glossary of differential geometry and topology, timeline of manifolds.

- Convention: Throughout the article, I denotes the unit interval, S^{n} the n-sphere and D^{n} the n-disk. Also, throughout the article, spaces are assumed to be reasonable; this can be taken to mean for example, a space is a CW complex or compactly generated weakly Hausdorff space. Similarly, no attempt is made to be definitive about the definition of a spectrum. A simplicial set is not thought of as a space; i.e., we generally distinguish between simplicial sets and their geometric realizations.
- Inclusion criterion: As there is no glossary of homological algebra in Wikipedia right now, this glossary also includes a few concepts in homological algebra (e.g., chain homotopy); some concepts in geometric topology and differential topology are also fair game. On the other hand, the items that appear in glossary of topology are generally omitted. Abstract homotopy theory and motivic homotopy theory are also outside the scope. Glossary of category theory covers (or will cover) concepts in theory of model categories. See the glossary of symplectic geometry for the topics in symplectic topology such as quantization.

== !$@ ==
*
The base point of a based space.
$X_+$
For an unbased space X, X_{+} is the based space obtained by adjoining a disjoint base point.

== A ==
absolute neighborhood retract
An absolute neighborhood retract is used as an alternative to a CW-complex as a nice space (the homotopy type of an ANR and that of a CW-complex are the same).
abstract
1. Abstract homotopy theory
Adams
1. John Frank Adams.
2. The Adams spectral sequence.
3. The Adams conjecture.
4. The Adams e-invariant.
5. The Adams operations.
Alexander duality
Alexander duality
Alexander trick
The Alexander trick produces a section of the restriction map $\operatorname{Top}(D^{n+1}) \to \operatorname{Top}(S^n)$, Top denoting a homeomorphism group; namely, the section is given by sending a homeomorphism $f: S^n \to S^n$ to the homeomorphism

$$\widetilde{f}: D^{n+1} \to D^{n+1}, \, 0 \mapsto 0, 0 \ne x \mapsto |x|f(x/|x|)$$.

This section is in fact a homotopy inverse.
Analysis Situs
Analysis Situs.
annulus
The annulus theorem.
approximate fibration
1. An approximate fibration, a generalization of a fibration and a projection in a locally trivial bundle.
2. A manifold approximate fibration is a proper approximate fibration between manifolds.
aspherical space
Aspherical space
assembly map
Atiyah
1. Michael Atiyah.
2. Atiyah duality.
3. The Atiyah–Hirzebruch spectral sequence.

== B ==
bar construction
based space
A pair (X, x_{0}) consisting of a space X and a point x_{0} in X.
Betti number
See Betti number.
Bing–Borsuk conjecture
See Bing–Borsuk conjecture.
Bockstein homomorphism
Borel
Borel conjecture.
Borel–Moore homology
Borsuk's theorem
Bott
1. Raoul Bott.
2. The Bott periodicity theorem for unitary groups say: $\pi_q U = \pi_{q+2} U, q \ge 0$.
3. The Bott periodicity theorem for orthogonal groups say: $\pi_q O = \pi_{q+8} O, q \ge 0$.
Brouwer fixed-point theorem
The Brouwer fixed-point theorem says that any map $f: D^n \to D^n$ has a fixed point.
Brown–Peterson spectrum
The Brown–Peterson spectrum.

== C ==
cap product
Casson
Casson invariant.
Čech cohomology
cellular
1. A map ƒ:X→Y between CW complexes is cellular if $f(X^n) \subset Y^n$ for all n.
2. The cellular approximation theorem says that every map between CW complexes is homotopic to a cellular map between them.
3. The cellular homology is the (canonical) homology of a CW complex. Note it applies to CW complexes and not to spaces in general. A cellular homology is highly computable; it is especially useful for spaces with natural cell decompositions like projective spaces or Grassmannian.
chain homotopy
Given chain maps $f, g: (C, d_C) \to (D, d_D)$ between chain complexes of modules, a chain homotopy s from f to g is a sequence of module homomorphisms $s_i: C_i \to D_{i+1}$ satisfying $f_i - g_i = d_D \circ s_i + s_{i-1} \circ d_C$. It is also called a homotopy operator.
chain map
A chain map $f: (C, d_C) \to (D, d_D)$ between chain complexes of modules is a sequence of module homomorphisms $f_i: C_i \to D_i$ that commutes with the differentials; i.e., $d_D \circ f_i = f_{i-1} \circ d_C$.
chain homotopy equivalence
A chain map that is an isomorphism up to chain homotopy; that is, if ƒ:C→D is a chain map, then it is a chain homotopy equivalence if there is a chain map g:D→C such that gƒ and ƒg are chain homotopic to the identity homomorphisms on C and D, respectively.
change of fiber
The change of fiber of a fibration p is a homotopy equivalence, up to homotopy, between the fibers of p induced by a path in the base.
character variety
The character variety of a group π and an algebraic group G (e.g., a reductive complex Lie group) is the geometric invariant theory quotient by G:

$$\mathcal{X}(\pi, G) = \operatorname{Hom}(\pi, G)/ \! /G$$.

characteristic class
Let Vect(X) be the set of isomorphism classes of vector bundles on X. We can view $X \mapsto \operatorname{Vect}(X)$ as a contravariant functor from Top to Set by sending a map ƒ:X → Y to the pullback ƒ^{*} along it. Then a characteristic class is a natural transformation from Vect to the cohomology functor H^{*}. Explicitly, to each vector bundle E we assign a cohomology class, say, c(E). The assignment is natural in the sense that ƒ^{*}c(E) = c(ƒ^{*}E).
chromatic homotopy theory
chromatic homotopy theory.
class
1. Chern class.
2. Stiefel–Whitney class.
classifying space
Loosely speaking, a classifying space is a space representing some contravariant functor defined on the category of spaces; for example, $BU$ is the classifying space in the sense $[-, BU]$ is the functor $X \mapsto \operatorname{Vect}^{\mathbb{R}}(X)$ that sends a space to the set of isomorphism classes of real vector bundles on the space.
clutching
cobar spectral sequence
cobordism
1. See cobordism.
2. A cobordism ring is a ring whose elements are cobordism classes.
3. See also h-cobordism theorem, s-cobordism theorem.
coefficient ring
If E is a ring spectrum, then the coefficient ring of it is the ring $\pi_* E$.
cofiber sequence
A cofiber sequence is any sequence that is equivalent to the sequence $X \overset{f}\to Y \to C_f$ for some ƒ where $C_f$ is the reduced mapping cone of ƒ (called the cofiber of ƒ).
cofibrant approximation
cofibration
A map $i: A \to B$ is a cofibration if it satisfies the property: given $h_0: B \to X$ and homotopy $g_t: A \to X$ such that $g_0=h_0\circ i$, there is a homotopy $h_t: B \to X$ such that $h_t \circ i = g_t$. A cofibration is injective and is a homeomorphism onto its image.
coherent homotopy
coherency
See coherency (homotopy theory)
cohomotopy group
For a based space X, the set of homotopy classes $[X, S^n]$ is called the n-th cohomotopy group of X.
cohomology operation
collapse
An informal phrase but usually means taking a quotient; e.g., a cone is obtained by collapsing the top (or bottom) of a cylinder.
collar
collar neighbourhood
completion
complex bordism
complex-oriented
A multiplicative cohomology theory E is complex-oriented if the restriction map E^{2}(CP^{∞}) → E^{2}(CP^{1}) is surjective.
concordant
cone
The cone over a space X is $CX = X \times I / X \times \{0\}$. The reduced cone is obtained from the reduced cylinder $X \wedge I_+$ by collapsing the top.
connective
A spectrum E is connective if $\pi_q E = 0$ for all negative integers q.
configuration space
constant
A constant sheaf on a space X is a sheaf $\mathcal{F}$ on X such that for some set A and some map $A \to \mathcal{F}(X)$, the natural map $A \to \mathcal{F}(X) \to \mathcal{F}_x$ is bijective for any x in X.
continuous
Continuous cohomology.
contractible space
A space is contractible if the identity map on the space is homotopic to the constant map.
covering
1. A map p: Y → X is a covering or a covering map if each point of x has a neighborhood N that is evenly covered by p; this means that the pre-image of N is a disjoint union of open sets, each of which maps to N homeomorphically.
2. It is n-sheeted if each fiber p^{−1}(x) has exactly n elements.
3. It is universal if Y is simply connected.
4. A morphism of a covering is a map over X. In particular, an automorphism of a covering p:Y→X (also called a deck transformation) is a map Y→Y over X that has inverse; i.e., a homeomorphism over X.
5. A G-covering is a covering arising from a group action on a space X by a group G, the covering map being the quotient map from X to the orbit space X/G. The notion is used to state the universal property: if X admits a universal covering (in particular connected), then

$\operatorname{Hom}(\pi_1(X, x_0), G)$ is the set of isomorphism classes of G-coverings.

In particular, if G is abelian, then the left-hand side is $\operatorname{Hom}(\pi_1(X, x_0), G) = \operatorname{H}^1(X; G)$ (cf. nonabelian cohomology.)

6. covering dimension.
cup product
CW complex
A CW complex is a space X equipped with a CW structure; i.e., a filtration

$$X^0 \subset X^1 \subset X^2 \subset \cdots \subset X$$

such that (1) X^{0} is discrete and (2) X^{n} is obtained from X^{n-1} by attaching n-cells.

cyclic homology

== D ==
deck transformation
Another term for an automorphism of a covering.
deformation retract
A subspace $A \subset X$ is called a deformation retract of X if there is a homotopy $h_t : X \to X$ such that $h_0$ is the identity, $h_1(X) \subset A$ and ${h_1}|_A$ is the identity (i.e., $h_1$ is a retract of $A \hookrightarrow X$ in the sense in category theory). It is called a strong deformation retract if, in addition, $h_t$ satisfies the requirement that ${h_t}|_A$ is the identity. For example, a homotopy $h_t : B \to B, \, x \mapsto (1-t)x$ exhibits that the origin is a strong deformation retract of an open ball B centered at the origin.
Deligne–Beilinson cohomology
Deligne–Beilinson cohomology
delooping
degeneracy cycle
degree
de Rham
1. de Rham cohomology, the cohomology of complex of differential forms.
2. The de Rham theorem gives an explicit isomorphism between the de Rham cohomology and the singular cohomology.
disjoint disk property
disjoint disk property.
Dold
The Dold–Thom theorem.
dominate
A space $Y$ is said to dominate a space $X$ if there are $p : Y \to X$ and $g : X \to Y$ such that $p \circ g : X \to X$ is homotopic to the identity.

== E ==
Eckmann–Hilton argument
The Eckmann–Hilton argument.
Eckmann–Hilton duality
Eilenberg–MacLane spaces
Given an abelian group π, the Eilenberg–MacLane spaces $K(\pi, n)$ are characterized by

$$\pi_q K(\pi, n)=
\begin{cases}
\pi & \text{if } q = n \\
0 & \text{otherwise}
\end{cases}$$.

Eilenberg–Steenrod axioms
The Eilenberg–Steenrod axioms are the set of axioms that any cohomology theory (singular, cellular, etc.) must satisfy. Weakening the axioms (namely dropping the dimension axiom) leads to a generalized cohomology theory.
Eilenberg–Zilber theorem
elliptic
elliptic cohomology.
E_{n}-algebra
equivariant algebraic topology
Equivariant algebraic topoloy is the study of spaces with (continuous) group action.
etale
étale homotopy.
Euclidean
A Euclidean neighborhood retract
exact
A sequence of pointed sets $X \overset{f}\to Y \overset{g}\to Z$ is exact if the image of f coincides with the pre-image of the chosen point of Z.
excision
The excision axiom for homology says: if $U \subset X$ and $\overline{U} \subset \operatorname{int}(A)$, then for each q,

$$\operatorname{H}_q(X-U,A-U) \to \operatorname{H}_q(X,A)$$

is an isomorphism.

excisive pair/triad

== F ==
factorization homology
fiber-homotopy equivalence
Given D→B, E→B, a map ƒ:D→E over B is a fiber-homotopy equivalence if it is invertible up to homotopy over B. The basic fact is that if D→B, E→B are fibrations, then a homotopy equivalence from D to E is a fiber-homotopy equivalence.
fiber sequence
The fiber sequence of a map $f: X \to Y$ is the sequence $F_f \overset{p} \to X \overset{f}\to Y$ where $F_f \overset{p} \to X$ is the homotopy fiber of f; i.e., the pullback of the path space fibration $PY \to Y$ along f.
fiber square
fiber square
fibration
A map p:E → B is a fibration if for any given homotopy $g_t: X \to B$ and a map $h_0: X \to E$ such that $p \circ h_0 = g_0$, there exists a homotopy $h_t: X \to E$ such that $p \circ h_t = g_t$. (The above property is called the homotopy lifting property.) A covering map is a basic example of a fibration.
fibration sequence
One says $F \to X \overset{p}\to B$ is a fibration sequence to mean that p is a fibration and that F is homotopy equivalent to the homotopy fiber of p, with some understanding of base points.
finitely dominated
fundamental class
fundamental group
The fundamental group of a space X with base point x_{0} is the group of homotopy classes of loops at x_{0}. It is precisely the first homotopy group of (X, x_{0}) and is thus denoted by $\pi_1(X, x_0)$.
fundamental groupoid
The fundamental groupoid of a space X is the category whose objects are the points of X and whose morphisms x → y are the homotopy classes of paths from x to y; thus, the set of all morphisms from an object x_{0} to itself is, by definition, the fundamental group $\pi_1(X, x_0)$.
framed
A framed manifold is a manifold with a framing.
free
Synonymous with unbased. For example, the free path space of a space X refers to the space of all maps from I to X; i.e., $X^I$ while the path space of a based space X consists of such map that preserve the base point (i.e., 0 goes to the base point of X).
Freedman
Freedman's E8 manifold.
Freudenthal suspension theorem
For a nondegenerately based space X, the Freudenthal suspension theorem says: if X is (n-1)-connected, then the suspension homomorphism

$$\pi_q X \to \pi_{q+1} \Sigma X$$

is bijective for q < 2n - 1 and is surjective if q = 2n - 1.
Fulton–MacPherson compactification
The Fulton–MacPherson compactification of the configuration space of n distinct labeled points in a compact complex manifold is a natural smooth compactification introduced by Fulton and MacPherson.

== G ==
G-fibration
A G-fibration with some topological monoid G. An example is Moore's path space fibration.
G-space
A G-space is a space together with an action of a group G (usually satisfying some conditions).
Γ-space
generalized cohomology theory
A generalized cohomology theory is a contravariant functor from the category of pairs of spaces to the category of abelian groups that satisfies all of the Eilenberg–Steenrod axioms except the dimension axiom.
geometrization conjecture
geometrization conjecture
genus
germ
germ
group completion
grouplike
An H-space X is said to be group-like or grouplike if $\pi_0 X$ is a group; i.e., X satisfies the group axioms up to homotopy.
Gysin sequence

== H ==
Hauptvermutung
1. Hauptvermutung, a German for main conjecture, is short for die Hauptvermutung der kombinatorischen Topologie (the main conjecture of combinatorial topology). It asks whether two simplicial complexes are isomorphic if homeomorphic. It was disproved by Milnor in 1961.
2. There are some variants; for example, one can ask whether two PL manifolds are PL-isomorphic if homeomorphic (which is also false).
h-cobordism
h-cobordism.
Hilton–Milnor theorem
The Hilton–Milnor theorem.
Hirzebruch
Hirzebruch signature theorem.
H-space
An H-space is a based space that is a unital magma up to homotopy.
Hodge
The Hodge spectral sequence.
homologous
Two cycles are homologous if they belong to the same homology class.
homology manifold
A homology manifold is a space that looks like a topological manifold, homology-theory speaking.
homology sphere
A homology sphere is a manifold having the homology type of a sphere.
homotopy category
Let C be a subcategory of the category of all spaces. Then the homotopy category of C is the category whose class of objects is the same as the class of objects of C but the set of morphisms from an object x to an object y is the set of the homotopy classes of morphisms from x to y in C. For example, a map is a homotopy equivalence if and only if it is an isomorphism in the homotopy category.
homotopy colimit
A homotopy colimit is a homotopically-correct version of colimit.
homotopy over a space B
A homotopy h_{t} such that for each fixed t, h_{t} is a map over B.
homotopy equivalence
1. A map ƒ:X→Y is a homotopy equivalence if it is invertible up to homotopy; that is, there exists a map g: Y→X such that g ∘ ƒ is homotopic to th identity map on X and ƒ ∘ g is homotopic to the identity map on Y.
2. Two spaces are said to be homotopy equivalent if there is a homotopy equivalence between the two. For example, by definition, a space is contractible if it is homotopy equivalent to a point space.
homotopy excision theorem
The homotopy excision theorem is a substitute for the failure of excision for homotopy groups.
homotopy fiber
The homotopy fiber of a based map ƒ:X→Y, denoted by Fƒ, is the pullback of $PY \to Y, \, \chi \mapsto \chi(1)$ along f.
homotopy fiber product
A fiber product is a particular kind of a limit. Replacing this limit lim with a homotopy limit holim yields a homotopy fiber product.
homotopy group
1. For a based space X, let $\pi_n X = [S^n, X]$, the set of homotopy classes of based maps. Then $\pi_0 X$ is the set of path-connected components of X, $\pi_1 X$ is the fundamental group of X and $\pi_n X, \, n \ge 2$ are the (higher) n-th homotopy groups of X.
2. For based spaces $A \subset X$, the relative homotopy group $\pi_n(X, A)$ is defined as $\pi_{n-1}$ of the space of paths that all start at the base point of X and end somewhere in A. Equivalently, it is the $\pi_{n-1}$ of the homotopy fiber of $A \hookrightarrow X$.
3. If E is a spectrum, then $\pi_k E = \varinjlim_{n} \pi_{k + n} E_n.$
4. If X is a based space, then the stable k-th homotopy group of X is $\pi_k^s X = \varinjlim_{n} \pi_{k + n} \Sigma^n X$. In other words, it is the k-th homotopy group of the suspension spectrum of X.
homotopy pullback
A homotopy pullback is a special case of a homotopy limit that is a homotopically-correct pullback.
homotopy quotient
If G is a Lie group acting on a manifold X, then the quotient space $(EG \times X)/G$ is called the homotopy quotient (or Borel construction) of X by G, where EG is the universal bundle of G.
homotopy spectral sequence
homotopy sphere
A homotopy sphere is a manifold having the homotopy type of a sphere.
Hopf
1. Heinz Hopf.
2. Hopf invariant.
3. The Hopf index theorem.
4. Hopf construction.
Hurewicz
The Hurewicz theorem establishes a relationship between homotopy groups and homology groups.

== I ==
infinite loop space
infinite loop space machine
Infinite loop space machine.
infinite mapping telescope
intersection
intersection pairing.
intersection homology, a substitute for an ordinary (singular) homology for a singular space.
intersection cohomology
integration along the fiber
See integration along the fiber.
invariance of domain
invariance of domain.
isotopy

== J ==
J-homomorphism
See J-homomorphism.
join
The join of based spaces X, Y is $X \star Y = \Sigma(X\wedge Y).$

== K ==
k-invariant
Kan complex
See Kan complex.
Kirby–Siebenmann
Kirby–Siebenmann classification.
Kervaire invariant
The Kervaire invariant.
Koszul duality
Koszul duality.
Kuiper
Kuiper's theorem says that the general linear group of an infinite-dimensional Hilbert space is contractible.
Künneth formula

== L ==
L-class
L-class.
Lazard ring
The Lazard ring L is the (huge) commutative ring together with the formal group law ƒ that is universal among all the formal group laws in the sense that any formal group law g over a commutative ring R is obtained via a ring homomorphism L → R mapping ƒ to g. According to Quillen's theorem, it is also the coefficient ring of the complex bordism MU. The Spec of L is called the moduli space of formal group laws.
Lefschetz
1. Solomon Lefschetz
2. The Lefschetz fixed-point theorem says: given a finite simplicial complex K and its geometric realization X, if a map $f: X \to X$ has no fixed point, then the Lefschetz number of f; that is,

$$\sum_0^\infty (-1)^q \operatorname{tr}(f_*: \operatorname{H}_q(X) \to \operatorname{H}_q(X))$$

is zero. For example, it implies the Brouwer fixed-point theorem since the Lefschetz number of $f: D^n \to D^n$ is, as higher homologies vanish, one.
3. The Lefschetz hyperplane theorem.
lens space
The lens space is the quotient space $\{ z \in \mathbb{C}^n | |z| = 1 \}/ \mu_p$ where $\mu_p$ is the group of p-th roots of unity acting on the unit sphere by $\zeta \cdot (z_1, \dots, z_n) = (\zeta z_1, \dots, \zeta z_n)$.
Leray spectral sequence
L^{2}
The L^{2}-cohomology of a Riemannian or Kähler manifold is the cohomology of the complexes of differential forms with square-integrable coefficients (coefficients for forms not cohomology).
local coefficient
1. A module over the group ring $\mathbb{Z}[\pi_1 B]$ for some based space B; in other words, an abelian group together with a homomorphism $\pi_1 B \to \operatorname{Aut}(A)$.
2. The local coefficient system over a based space B with an abelian group A is a fiber bundle over B with discrete fiber A. If B admits a universal covering $\widetilde{B}$, then this meaning coincides with that of 1. in the sense: every local coefficient system over B can be given as the associated bundle $\widetilde{B} \times_{\pi_1 B} A$.
local invariant
Local invariant cycle theorem.
local sphere
The localization of a sphere at some prime number
local system
local system.
localization
locally constant sheaf
A locally constant sheaf on a space X is a sheaf such that each point of X has an open neighborhood on which the sheaf is constant.
loop space
The loop space $\Omega X$ of a based space X is the space of all loops starting and ending at the base point of X.

== M ==
Madsen–Weiss theorem
mapping
1.

The mapping cone of a map ƒ:X→Y is obtained by gluing the cone over X to Y.

The mapping cone (or cofiber) of a map ƒ:X→Y is $C_f = Y \cup_f CX$.
2. The mapping cylinder of a map ƒ:X→Y is $M_f = Y \cup_f (X \times I)$. Note: $C_f = M_f/(X \times \{0\})$.
3. The reduced versions of the above are obtained by using reduced cone and reduced cylinder.
4. The mapping path space P_{p} of a map p:E→B is the pullback of $B^I \to B$ along p. If p is fibration, then the natural map E→P_{p} is a fiber-homotopy equivalence; thus, one can replace E by the mapping path space without changing the homotopy type of the fiber. A mapping path space is also called a mapping cocylinder.
5. As a set, the mapping space from a space X to a space Y is the set of all continuous maps from X to Y. It is topologized in such a way the mapping space is a space; tha is, an object in the category of spaces used in algebraic topology; e.g., the category of compactly generated weak Hausdorff spaces. This topology may or may not be compact-open topology.
Mayer–Vietoris sequence
microbundle
microbundle
model category
A presentation of an ∞-category. See also model category.
Moore
1. Moore space
2. Moore path space.
multiplicative
A generalized cohomology theory E is multiplicative if E^{*}(X) is a graded ring. For example, the ordinary cohomology theory and the complex K-theory are multiplicative (in fact, cohomology theories defined by E_{∞}-rings are multiplicative.)

== N ==
n-cell
Another term for an n-disk.
n-connected
A based space X is n-connected if $\pi_q X = 0$ for all integers q ≤ n. For example, "1-connected" is the same thing as "simply connected".
n-equivalent
NDR-pair
A pair of spaces $A \subset X$ is said to be an NDR-pair (=neighborhood deformation retract pair) if there is a map $u: X \to I$ and a homotopy $h_t: X \to X$ such that $A =u^{-1}(0)$, $h_0 = \operatorname{id}_X$, $h_t|_A = \operatorname{id}_A$ and $h_1(\{x | u(x) < 1\}) \subset A$.
If A is a closed subspace of X, then the pair $A \subset X$ is an NDR-pair if and only if $A \hookrightarrow X$ is a cofibration.
nilpotent
1. nilpotent space; for example, a simply connected space is nilpotent.
2. The nilpotent theorem.
nonabelian
1. nonabelian cohomology
2. nonabelian algebraic topology
normalized
Given a simplicial group G, the normalized chain complex NG of G is given by $(NG)_n = \cap_1^{\infty} \operatorname{ker}d_i^n$ with the n-th differential given by $d^n_0$; intuitively, one throws out degenerate chains. It is also called the Moore complex.

== O ==
obstruction cocycle
obstruction theory
Obstruction theory is the collection of constructions and calculations indicating when some map on a submanifold (subcomplex) can or cannot be extended to the full manifold. These typically involve the Postnikov tower, killing homotopy groups, obstruction cocycles, etc.
of finite type
A CW complex is of finite type if there are only finitely many cells in each dimension.
operad
The portmanteau of “operations” and “monad”. See operad.
orbibundle
orbibundle.
orbit category
orientation
1. The orientation covering (or orientation double cover) of a manifold is a two-sheeted covering so that each fiber over x corresponds to two different ways of orienting a neighborhood of x.
2. An orientation of a manifold is a section of an orientation covering; i.e., a consistent choice of a point in each fiber.
3. An orientation character (also called the first Stiefel–Whitney class) is a group homomorphism $\pi_1(X, x_0) \to \{\pm 1\}$ that corresponds to an orientation covering of a manifold X (cf. #covering.)
4. See also orientation of a vector bundle as well as orientation sheaf.

== P ==
pair
1. A pair $(X, A)$ of spaces is a space X together with a subspace $A \subset X$.
2. A map of pairs $(X, A) \to (Y, B)$ is a map $X \to Y$ such that $f(A) \subset B$.
p-adic homotopy theory
The p-adic homotopy theory.
parallelizable
path class
An equivalence class of paths (two paths are equivalent if they are homotopic to each other).
path lifting
A path lifting function for a map p: E → B is a section of $E^I \to P_p$ where $P_p$ is the mapping path space of p. For example, a covering is a fibration with a unique path lifting function. By formal consideration, a map is a fibration if and only if there is a path lifting function for it.
path space
The path space of a based space X is $PX = \operatorname{Map}(I, X)$, the space of based maps, where the base point of I is 0. Put in another way, it is the (set-theoretic) fiber of $X^I \to X, \, \chi \mapsto \chi(0)$ over the base point of X. The projection $PX \to X, \, \chi \mapsto \chi(1)$ is called the path space fibration, whose fiber over the base point of X is the loop space $\Omega X$. See also mapping path space.
perverse
A perverse sheaf.
phantom map
phantom map
piecewise algebraic space
piecewise algebraic space, the notion introduced by Kontsevich and Soibelman.
PL
1. PL short for piecewise linear.
2. A PL manifold is a topological manifold with a maximal PL atlas where a PL atlas is an atlas in which the transition maps are PL.
3. A PL space is a space with a locally finite simplicial triangulation.
Poincaré
1. Henri Poincaré.
2. The Poincaré duality theorem says: given a manifold M of dimension n and an abelian group A, there is a natural isomorphism

$$\operatorname{H}^*_c(M; A) \simeq \operatorname{H}_{n - *}(M; A)$$.

3. Poincaré conjecture
4. Poincaré lemma states the higher de Rham cohomology of a contractible smooth manifold vanishes.
5. Poincaré homology sphere.
Pontrjagin–Thom construction
Postnikov system
A Postnikov system is a sequence of fibrations, such that all preceding manifolds have vanishing homotopy groups below a given dimension.
principal fibration
Usually synonymous with G-fibration.
prime decomposition
profinite
profinite homotopy theory; it studies profinite spaces.
properly discontinuous
Not particularly a precise term. But it could mean, for example, that G is discrete and each point of the G-space has a neighborhood V such that for each g in G that is not the identity element, gV intersects V at finitely many points.
pseudomanifold
pseudomanifold
pullback
Given a map p:E→B, the pullback of p along ƒ:X→B is the space $f^*E = \{ (e, x) \in E \times X | p(e) = f(x) \}$ (succinctly it is the equalizer of p and f). It is a space over X through a projection.
Puppe sequence
The Puppe sequence refers ro either of the sequences

$$X \overset{f}\to Y \to C_f \to \Sigma X \to \Sigma Y \to \cdots,$$
$$\cdots \to \Omega X \to \Omega Y \to F_f \to X \overset{f}\to Y$$

where $C_f, F_f$ are homotopy cofiber and homotopy fiber of f.

pushout
Given $A \subset B$ and a map $f: A \to X$, the pushout of X and B along f is

$$X \cup_f B = X \sqcup B/(a \sim f(a))$$;

that is X and B are glued together along A through f. The map f is usually called the attaching map.

An important example is when B = D^{n}, A = S^{n-1}; in that case, forming such a pushout is called attaching an n-cell (meaning an n-disk) to X.

== Q ==
quasi-fibration
A quasi-fibration is a map such that the fibers are homotopy equivalent to each other.
Quillen
1. Daniel Quillen
2. Quillen’s theorem says that $\pi_* MU$ is the Lazard ring.

== R ==
rational
1. The rational homotopy theory.
2. The rationalization of a space X is, roughly, the localization of X at zero. More precisely, X_{0} together with j: X → X_{0} is a rationalization of X if the map $\pi_* X \otimes \mathbb{Q} \to \pi_* X_0 \otimes \mathbb{Q}$ induced by j is an isomorphism of vector spaces and $\pi_* X_0 \otimes \mathbb{Q} \simeq \pi_* X_0$.
3. The rational homotopy type of X is the weak homotopy type of X_{0}.
4. A rational homology manifold.
regulator
1. Borel regulator.
2. Beilinson regulator.
Reidemeister
Reidemeister torsion.
reduced
The reduced suspension of a based space X is the smash product $\Sigma X = X \wedge S^1$. It is related to the loop functor by $\operatorname{Map}(\Sigma X, Y) = \operatorname{Map}(X, \Omega Y)$ where $\Omega Y = \operatorname{Map}(S^1, Y)$ is the loop space.
resolution
A resolution of a space X is a map $M \to X$ from a topological or smooth manifold that is locally a homotopy equivalence. A space is resolvable if it admits a reoslution.
retract
1. A retract of a map f is a map r such that $r \circ f$ is the identity (in other words, f is a section of r).
2. A subspace $A \subset X$ is called a retract if the inclusion map $A \hookrightarrow X$ admits a retract (see #deformation retract).
ring spectrum
A ring spectrum is a spectrum satisfying the ring axioms, either on nose or up to homotopy. For example, a complex K-theory is a ring spectrum.
Rokhlin
Rokhlin invariant.

== S ==
Samelson product
Schoenflies
Schoenflies problem
Serre
1. Jean-Pierre Serre.
2. Serre class.
3. Serre spectral sequence.
shape
Shape theory.
simple
simple-homotopy equivalence
A map ƒ:X→Y between finite simplicial complexes (e.g., manifolds) is a simple-homotopy equivalence if it is homotopic to a composition of finitely many elementary expansions and elementary collapses. A homotopy equivalence is a simple-homotopy equivalence if and only if its Whitehead torsion vanishes.
simplicial approximation
See simplicial approximation theorem.
simplicial complex
See simplicial complex; the basic example is a triangulation of a manifold.
simplicial homology
A simplicial homology is the (canonical) homology of a simplicial complex. Note it applies to simplicial complexes and not to spaces; cf. #singular homology.
signature invariant
singular
1. Given a space X and an abelian group π, the singular homology group of X with coefficients in π is

$$\operatorname{H}_*(X; \pi) = \operatorname{H}_*(C_*(X) \otimes \pi)$$

where $C_*(X)$ is the singular chain complex of X; i.e., the n-th degree piece is the free abelian group generated by all the maps $\triangle^n \to X$ from the standard n-simplex to X. A singular homology is a special case of a simplicial homology; indeed, for each space X, there is the singular simplicial complex of X whose homology is the singular homology of X.
2. The singular simplices functor is the functor $\mathbf{Top} \to s\mathbf{Set}$ from the category of all spaces to the category of simplicial sets, that is the right adjoint to the geometric realization functor.
3. The singular simplicial complex of a space X is the normalized chain complex of the singular simplex of X.
slant product
small object argument
smash product
The smash product of based spaces X, Y is $X \wedge Y = X \times Y / X \vee Y$. It is characterized by the adjoint relation

$$\operatorname{Map}(X \wedge Y, Z) = \operatorname{Map}(X, \operatorname{Map}(Y, Z))$$.

Spanier–Whitehead
The Spanier–Whitehead duality.
spectrum
Roughly a sequence of spaces together with the maps (called the structure maps) between the consecutive terms; see spectrum (topology).
sphere bundle
A sphere bundle is a fiber bundle whose fibers are spheres.
sphere spectrum
The sphere spectrum is a spectrum consisting of a sequence of spheres $S^0, S^1, S^2, S^3, \dots$ together with the maps between the spheres given by suspensions. In short, it is the suspension spectrum of $S^0$.
Spivak
Spivak normal fibration
stable homotopy group
See #homotopy group.
Steenrod homology
Steenrod homology.
Steenrod operation
Sullivan
1. Dennis Sullivan.
2. The Sullivan conjecture.
3. Sullivan, Dennis (1977), "Infinitesimal computations in topology", Publications Mathématiques de l'IHÉS, 47: 269–331, doi:10.1007/BF02684341, S2CID 42019745 - introduces rational homotopy theory (along with Quillen's paper).
4. The Sullivan algebra in the rational homotopy theory.
super
1. A superspace is a locally ringed space whose structure sheaf is a sheaf of superrings.
2. supermanifold.
suspension spectrum
The suspension spectrum of a based space X is the spectrum given by $X_n = \Sigma^n X$.
stratified
1. A stratified space is a topological space with a stratification.
2. A stratified Morse theory is a Morse theory done on a stratified space.
symmetric spectrum
See symmetric spectrum.
symplectic topology
symplectic topology.

== T ==
Tate
Tate sphere
telescope
Thom
1. René Thom.
2. If E is a vector bundle on a paracompact space X, then the Thom space $\text{Th}(E)$ of E is obtained by first replacing each fiber by its compactification and then collapsing the base X.
3. The Thom isomorphism says: for each orientable vector bundle E of rank n on a manifold X, a choice of an orientation (the Thom class of E) induces an isomorphism

$$\widetilde{\operatorname{H}}^{*+n}(\text{Th}(E); \mathbb{Z})\simeq \operatorname{H}^*(X; \mathbb{Z})$$.

4. Thom's first and second isotopy lemmas.
5. A Thom mapping originally called a mapping "sans éclatement"
topological chiral homology
topological fundamental group
transfer
transgression
triangulation
triangulation.

== U ==
universal coefficient
The universal coefficient theorem.
up to homotopy
A statement holds in the homotopy category as opposed to the category of spaces.

== V ==
V-manifold
An old term for an orbifold.
van Kampen
The van Kampen theorem says: if a space X is path-connected and if x_{0} is a point in X, then

$$\pi_1(X, x_0) = \varinjlim \pi_1(U, x_0)$$

where the colimit runs over some open cover of X consisting of path-connected open subsets containing x_{0} such that the cover is closed under finite intersections.
Verdier
Verdier duality.

== W ==
Waldhausen S-construction
Waldhausen S-construction.
Wall's finiteness obstruction
Warsaw
The Warsaw circle gives an important counterexample to the Whitehead theorem.
weak equivalence
A map ƒ:X→Y of based spaces is a weak equivalence if for each q, the induced map $f_*: \pi_q X \to \pi_q Y$ is bijective.
wedge
For based spaces X, Y, the wedge product $X \wedge Y$ of X and Y is the coproduct of X and Y; concretely, it is obtained by taking their disjoint union and then identifying the respective base points.
well pointed
A based space is well pointed (or non-degenerately based) if the inclusion of the base point is a cofibration.
Whitehead
1. J. H. C. Whitehead.
2. Whitehead's theorem says that for CW complexes, the homotopy equivalence is the same thing as the weak equivalence.
3. Whitehead group.
4. Whitehead product.
winding number
1. winding number.
Witt
Witt space.
