= List of algebraic topology topics =

Algebraic topology uses abstract algebra to study topological spaces

This is a list of algebraic topology topics.

Algebraic topology is a branch of mathematics that uses tools from abstract algebra to study topological spaces. The basic goal is to find algebraic invariants that classify topological spaces up to homeomorphism, though usually most classify up to homotopy equivalence.

Although algebraic topology primarily uses algebra to study topological problems, using topology to solve algebraic problems is sometimes also possible. Algebraic topology, for example, allows for a convenient proof that any subgroup of a free group is again a free group.

== Homology (mathematics) ==
- Simplex
- Simplicial complex
  - Polytope
  - Triangulation
  - Barycentric subdivision
  - Simplicial approximation theorem
  - Abstract simplicial complex
  - Simplicial set
  - Simplicial category
- Chain (algebraic topology)
- Betti number
- Euler characteristic
  - Genus
  - Riemann–Hurwitz formula
- Singular homology
- Cellular homology
- Relative homology
- Mayer–Vietoris sequence
- Excision theorem
- Universal coefficient theorem
- Cohomology
  - List of cohomology theories
  - Cocycle class
  - Cup product
  - Cohomology ring
  - De Rham cohomology
  - Čech cohomology
  - Alexander–Spanier cohomology
  - Intersection cohomology
  - Lusternik–Schnirelmann category
- Poincaré duality
- Fundamental class
- Applications
  - Jordan curve theorem
  - Brouwer fixed point theorem
  - Invariance of domain
  - Lefschetz fixed-point theorem
  - Hairy ball theorem
  - Degree of a continuous mapping
  - Borsuk–Ulam theorem
  - Ham sandwich theorem
  - Homology sphere

== Homotopy theory ==
- Homotopy
- Path (topology)
- Fundamental group
- Homotopy group
- Seifert–van Kampen theorem
- Pointed space
- Winding number
- Simply connected
  - Universal cover
- Monodromy
- Homotopy lifting property
- Mapping cylinder
- Mapping cone (topology)
- Wedge sum
- Smash product
- Adjunction space
- Cohomotopy
- Cohomotopy group
- Brown's representability theorem
- Eilenberg–MacLane space
- Fibre bundle
  - Möbius strip
  - Line bundle
    - Canonical line bundle
  - Vector bundle
  - Associated bundle
  - Fibration
  - Hopf bundle
  - Classifying space
- Cofibration
- Homotopy groups of spheres
- Plus construction
- Whitehead theorem
- Weak equivalence
- Hurewicz theorem
- H-space

== Further developments ==
- Künneth theorem
- De Rham cohomology
- Obstruction theory
- Characteristic class
  - Chern class
  - Chern–Simons form
  - Pontryagin class
  - Pontryagin number
  - Stiefel–Whitney class
- Poincaré conjecture
- Cohomology operation
  - Steenrod algebra
- Bott periodicity theorem
- K-theory
  - Topological K-theory
  - Adams operation
  - Algebraic K-theory
  - Whitehead torsion
  - Twisted K-theory
- Cobordism
- Thom space
- Suspension functor
- Stable homotopy theory
- Spectrum (homotopy theory)
- Morava K-theory
- Hodge conjecture
- Weil conjectures
- Directed algebraic topology

=== Applied topology ===
Example: DE-9IM

== Homological algebra ==
- Chain complex
- Commutative diagram
- Exact sequence
  - Five lemma
  - Short five lemma
  - Snake lemma
  - Splitting lemma
  - Extension problem
- Spectral sequence
- Abelian category
- Group cohomology
- Sheaf
  - Sheaf cohomology
  - Grothendieck topology
- Derived category

== History ==
- Combinatorial topology

== See also ==
- Glossary of algebraic topology
- topology glossary
- List of topology topics
- List of general topology topics
- List of geometric topology topics
- Publications in topology
- Topological property
