= Bing–Borsuk conjecture =

In mathematics, the Bing–Borsuk conjecture states that every $n$-dimensional homogeneous absolute neighborhood retract space is a topological manifold. The conjecture has been proved for dimensions 1 and 2, and it is known that the 3-dimensional version of the conjecture implies the Poincaré conjecture.

== Definitions ==
A topological space is homogeneous if, for any two points $m_1, m_2 \in M$, there is a homeomorphism of $M$ which takes $m_1$ to $m_2$.

A metric space $M$ is an absolute neighborhood retract (ANR) if, for every closed embedding $f: M \rightarrow N$ (where $N$ is a metric space), there exists an open neighbourhood $U$ of the image $f(M)$ which retracts to $f(M)$.

There is an alternate statement of the Bing–Borsuk conjecture: suppose $M$ is embedded in $\mathbb{R}^{m+n}$ for some $m \geq 3$ and this embedding can be extended to an embedding of $M \times (-\varepsilon, \varepsilon)$. If $M$ has a mapping cylinder neighbourhood $N=C_\varphi$ of some map $\varphi: \partial N \rightarrow M$ with mapping cylinder projection $\pi: N \rightarrow M$, then $\pi$ is an approximate fibration.

== History ==
The conjecture was first made in a paper by R. H. Bing and Karol Borsuk in 1965, who proved it for $n=1$ and 2.

Włodzimierz Jakobsche showed in 1978 that, if the Bing–Borsuk conjecture is true in dimension 3, then the Poincaré conjecture must also be true.

The Busemann conjecture states that every Busemann $G$-space is a topological manifold. It is a special case of the Bing–Borsuk conjecture. The Busemann conjecture is known to be true for dimensions 1 to 4.
