= G-fibration =

Concept in algebraic topology

In algebraic topology, a G-fibration or principal fibration is a generalization of a principal G-bundle, just as a fibration is a generalization of a fiber bundle. By definition, given a topological monoid G, a G-fibration is a fibration p: P→B together with a continuous right monoid action P × G → P such that

- (1) $p(x g) = p(x)$ for all x in P and g in G.
- (2) For each x in P, the map $G \to p^{-1}(p(x)), g \mapsto xg$ is a weak equivalence.

A principal G-bundle is a prototypical example of a G-fibration. Another example is Moore's path space fibration: namely, let $P'X$ be the space of paths of various length in a based space X. Then the fibration $p: P'X \to X$ that sends each path to its end-point is a G-fibration with G the space of loops of various lengths in X.
