= VECT =

VECT or Vect may refer to:

- VECT, the ICAO code of Chitrakoot Airport
- K-Vect, the category of vector spaces over a field K
- Vect(X), the set of isomorphism classes of vector bundles on a space X, see Glossary of algebraic topology
- Vect(X), the space of smooth vector fields on a manifold X, see Lie bracket of vector fields

== See also ==
- vect-, a Latin morpheme, see List of Greek and Latin roots in English/V
