= Homotopy category =

Concept in math

In mathematics, the homotopy category is a category built from the category of topological spaces which in a sense identifies two spaces that have the same shape. The phrase is in fact used for two different (but related) categories, as discussed below.

More generally, instead of starting with the category of topological spaces, one may start with any model category and define its associated homotopy category, with a construction introduced by Quillen in 1967. In this way, homotopy theory can be applied to many other categories in geometry and algebra.

== The naive homotopy category ==
The category of topological spaces Top has topological spaces as objects and as morphisms the continuous maps between them. The older definition of the homotopy category hTop, called the naive homotopy category for clarity in this article, has the same objects, and a morphism is a homotopy class of continuous maps. That is, two continuous maps f : X → Y are considered the same in the naive homotopy category if one can be continuously deformed to the other. There is a functor from Top to hTop that sends spaces to themselves and morphisms to their homotopy classes. A map f : X → Y is called a homotopy equivalence if it becomes an isomorphism in the naive homotopy category.

Example: The circle S^{1}, the plane R^{2} minus the origin, and the Möbius strip are all homotopy equivalent, although these topological spaces are not homeomorphic.

The notation [X,Y ] is often used for the hom-set from a space X to a space Y in the naive homotopy category (but it is also used for the related categories discussed below).

== The homotopy category, following Quillen ==
Quillen (1967) emphasized another category which further simplifies the category of topological spaces. Homotopy theorists have to work with both categories from time to time, but the consensus is that Quillen's version is more important, and so it is often called simply the "homotopy category".

One first defines a weak homotopy equivalence: a continuous map is called a weak homotopy equivalence if it induces a bijection on sets of path components and a bijection on homotopy groups with arbitrary base points. Then the (true) homotopy category is defined by localizing the category of topological spaces with respect to the weak homotopy equivalences. That is, the objects are still the topological spaces, but an inverse morphism is added for each weak homotopy equivalence. This has the effect that a continuous map becomes an isomorphism in the homotopy category if and only if it is a weak homotopy equivalence. There are obvious functors from the category of topological spaces to the naive homotopy category (as defined above), and from there to the homotopy category.

Results of J.H.C. Whitehead, in particular Whitehead's theorem and the existence of CW approximations, give a more explicit description of the homotopy category. Namely, the homotopy category is equivalent to the full subcategory of the naive homotopy category that consists of CW complexes. In this respect, the homotopy category strips away much of the complexity of the category of topological spaces.

Example: Let X be the set of natural numbers {0, 1, 2, ...} and let Y be the set {0} ∪ {1, 1/2, 1/3, ...}, both with the subspace topology from the real line. Define f : X → Y by mapping 0 to 0 and n to 1/n for n positive. Then f is continuous, and in fact a weak homotopy equivalence, but it is not a homotopy equivalence. Thus the naive homotopy category distinguishes spaces such as X and Y, whereas they become isomorphic in the homotopy category.

For topological spaces X and Y, the notation [X,Y ] may be used for the set of morphisms from X to Y in either the naive homotopy category or the true homotopy category, depending on the context.

=== Eilenberg–MacLane spaces ===
One motivation for these categories is that many invariants of topological spaces are defined on the naive homotopy category or even on the true homotopy category. For example, for a weak homotopy equivalence of topological spaces f : X → Y, the associated homomorphism f_{*} : H_{i}(X,Z) → H_{i}(Y,Z) of singular homology groups is an isomorphism for all natural numbers i. It follows that, for each natural number i, singular homology H_{i} can be viewed as a functor from the homotopy category to the category of abelian groups. In particular, two homotopic maps from X to Y induce the same homomorphism on singular homology groups.

Singular cohomology has an even better property: it is a representable functor on the homotopy category. That is, for each abelian group A and natural number i, there is a CW complex K(A,i) called an Eilenberg–MacLane space and a cohomology class u in H^{i}(K(A,i),A) such that the resulting function

$$[X,K(A,i)] \to H^i(X,A)$$

(giving by pulling u back to X) is bijective for all topological spaces X. Here [X,Y ] must be understood to mean the set of maps in the true homotopy category, if one wants this statement to hold for all topological spaces X. It holds in the naive homotopy category if X is a CW complex.

=== Pointed version ===
One useful variant is the homotopy category of pointed spaces. A pointed space means a pair (X,x) with X a topological space and x a point in X, called the base point. The category Top_{*} of pointed spaces has objects the pointed spaces, and a morphism f : X → Y is a continuous map that takes the base point of X to the base point of Y. The naive homotopy category of pointed spaces has the same objects, and morphisms are homotopy classes of pointed maps (meaning that the base point remains fixed throughout the homotopy). Finally, the "true" homotopy category of pointed spaces is obtained from the category Top_{*} by inverting the pointed maps that are weak homotopy equivalences.

For pointed spaces X and Y, [X,Y ] may denote the set of morphisms from X to Y in either version of the homotopy category of pointed spaces, depending on the context.

Several basic constructions in homotopy theory are naturally defined on the category of pointed spaces (or on the associated homotopy category), not on the category of spaces. For example, the suspension ΣX and the loop space ΩX are defined for a pointed space X and produce another pointed space. Also, the smash product X∧Y is an important functor of pointed spaces X and Y. For example, the suspension can be defined as

$$\Sigma X = S^1\wedge X.$$

The suspension and loop space functors form an adjoint pair of functors, in the sense that there is a natural isomorphism

$$[\Sigma X, Y] \cong [X,\Omega Y]$$

for all spaces X and Y.

== Concrete categories ==
While the objects of a homotopy category are sets (with additional structure), the morphisms are not actual functions between them, but rather classes of functions (in the naive homotopy category) or "zigzags" of functions (in the homotopy category). Indeed, Freyd showed that neither the naive homotopy category of pointed spaces nor the homotopy category of pointed spaces is a concrete category. That is, there is no faithful functor from these categories to the category of sets.

== Model categories ==
There is a more general concept: the homotopy category of a model category. A model category is a category C with three distinguished types of morphisms called fibrations, cofibrations and weak equivalences, satisfying several axioms. The associated homotopy category is defined by localizing C with respect to the weak equivalences.

This construction, applied to the model category of topological spaces with its standard model structure (sometimes called the Quillen model structure), gives the homotopy category defined above. Many other model structures have been considered on the category of topological spaces, depending on how much one wants to simplify the category. For example, in the Hurewicz model structure on topological spaces, the associated homotopy category is the naive homotopy category defined above.

The same homotopy category can arise from many different model categories. An important example is the standard model structure on simplicial sets: the associated homotopy category is equivalent to the homotopy category of topological spaces, even though simplicial sets are combinatorially defined objects that lack any topology. Some topologists prefer instead to work with compactly generated weak Hausdorff spaces; again, with the standard model structure, the associated homotopy category is equivalent to the homotopy category of all topological spaces.

For a more algebraic example of a model category, let A be a Grothendieck abelian category, for example the category of modules over a ring or the category of sheaves of abelian groups on a topological space. Then there is a model structure on the category of chain complexes of objects in A, with the weak equivalences being the quasi-isomorphisms. The resulting homotopy category is called the derived category DA.

Finally, the stable homotopy category is defined as the homotopy category associated to a model structure on the category of spectra. Various different categories of spectra have been considered, but all the accepted definitions yield the same homotopy category.
