= Busemann G-space =

In mathematics, a Busemann G-space is a type of metric space first described by Herbert Busemann in 1942.

If $(X,d)$ is a metric space such that

1. for every two distinct $x, y \in X$ there exists $z \in X\setminus\{x,y\}$ such that $d(x,z)+d(y,z)=d(x,y)$ (Menger convexity)
2. every $d$-bounded set of infinite cardinality possesses accumulation points
3. for every $w \in X$ there exists $\rho_w$ such that for any distinct points $x,y \in B(w,\rho_w)$ there exists $z \in ( B(w,\rho_w)\setminus\{ x,y \} )^\circ$ such that $d(x,y)+d(y,z)=d(x,z)$ (geodesics are locally extendable)
4. for any distinct points $x,y \in X$, if $u,v \in X$ such that $d(x,y)+d(y,u)=d(x,u)$, $d(x,y)+d(y,v)=d(x,v)$ and $d(y,u)=d(y,v)$, then $u=v$ (geodesic extensions are unique).

then X is said to be a Busemann G-space. Every Busemann G-space is a homogeneous space.

The Busemann conjecture states that every Busemann G-space is a topological manifold. It is a special case of the Bing–Borsuk conjecture. The Busemann conjecture is known to be true for dimensions 1 to 4.
