= Path space (algebraic topology) =

In algebraic topology, a branch of mathematics, the based path space $PX$ of a pointed space $(X, *)$ is the space that consists of all maps $f$ from the interval $I = [0, 1]$ to X such that $f(0) = *$, called based paths. In other words, it is the mapping space from $(I, 0)$ to $(X, *)$.

A space $X^I$ of all maps from $I$ to X, with no distinguished point for the start of the paths, is called the free path space of X. The maps from $I$ to X are called free paths. The path space $PX$ is then the pullback of $X^I \to X, \, \chi \mapsto \chi(0)$ along $* \hookrightarrow X$.

The natural map $PX \to X, \, \chi \to \chi(1)$ is a fibration called the path space fibration.

== See also ==
- Mapping space
