= Path space fibration =

In algebraic topology, the path space fibration over a pointed space $(X, *)$ is a fibration of the form

$$\Omega X \hookrightarrow PX \overset{\chi \mapsto \chi(1)}\to X$$

where

- $PX$ is the based path space of the pointed space $(X, *)$; that is, $PX = \{ f\colon I \to X \mid f \ \text{continuous}, f(0) = * \}$ equipped with the compact-open topology.
- $\Omega X$ is the fiber of $\chi \mapsto \chi(1)$ over the base point of $(X, *)$; thus it is the loop space of $(X, *)$.

The free path space of X, that is, $\operatorname{Map}(I, X) = X^I$, consists of all maps from I to X that do not necessarily begin at a base point, and the fibration $X^I \to X$ given by, say, $\chi \mapsto \chi(1)$, is called the free path space fibration.

The path space fibration can be understood to be dual to the mapping cone. The fiber of the based fibration is called the mapping fiber or, equivalently, the homotopy fiber.

== Mapping path space ==
If $f\colon X\to Y$ is any map, then the mapping path space $P_f$ of $f$ is the pullback of the fibration $Y^I \to Y, \, \chi \mapsto \chi(1)$ along $f$. (A mapping path space satisfies the universal property that is dual to that of a mapping cylinder, which is a push-out. Because of this, a mapping path space is also called a mapping cocylinder.)

Since a fibration pulls back to a fibration, if Y is based, one has the fibration

$$F_f \hookrightarrow P_f \overset{p}\to Y$$

where $p(x, \chi) = \chi(0)$ and $F_f$ is the homotopy fiber, the pullback of the fibration $PY \overset{\chi \mapsto \chi(1)}{\longrightarrow} Y$ along $f$.

Note also $f$ is the composition

$$X \overset{\phi}\to P_f \overset{p}\to Y$$

where the first map $\phi$ sends x to $(x, c_{f(x)})$; here $c_{f(x)}$ denotes the constant path with value $f(x)$. Clearly, $\phi$ is a homotopy equivalence; thus, the above decomposition says that any map is a fibration up to homotopy equivalence.

If $f$ is a fibration to begin with, then the map $\phi\colon X \to P_f$ is a fiber-homotopy equivalence and, consequently, the fibers of $f$ over the path-component of the base point are homotopy equivalent to the homotopy fiber $F_f$ of $f$.

== Moore's path space ==
By definition, a path in a space X is a map from the unit interval I to X. Again by definition, the product of two paths $\alpha, \beta$ such that $\alpha(1) = \beta(0)$ is the path $\beta \cdot \alpha\colon I \to X$ given by:

$$(\beta \cdot \alpha)(t)=
\begin{cases}
\alpha(2t) & \text{if } 0 \le t \le 1/2 \\
\beta(2t-1) & \text{if } 1/2 \le t \le 1 \\
\end{cases}$$.

This product, in general, fails to be associative on the nose: $(\gamma \cdot \beta) \cdot \alpha \ne \gamma \cdot (\beta \cdot \alpha)$, as seen directly. One solution to this failure is to pass to homotopy classes: one has $[(\gamma \cdot \beta) \cdot \alpha] = [\gamma \cdot (\beta \cdot \alpha)]$. Another solution is to work with paths of arbitrary lengths, leading to the notions of Moore's path space and Moore's path space fibration, described below. (A more sophisticated solution is to rethink composition: work with an arbitrary family of compositions; see the introduction of Lurie's paper, leading to the notion of an operad.)

Given a based space $(X, *)$, we let

$$P' X = \{ f\colon [0, r] \to X \mid r \ge 0, f(0) = * \}.$$

An element f of this set has a unique extension $\widetilde{f}$ to the interval $[0, \infty)$ such that $\widetilde{f}(t) = f(r),\, t \ge r$. Thus, the set can be identified as a subspace of $\operatorname{Map}([0, \infty), X)$. The resulting space is called the Moore path space of X, after John Coleman Moore, who introduced the concept. Then, just as before, there is a fibration, Moore's path space fibration:

$$\Omega' X \hookrightarrow P'X \overset{p}\to X$$

where p sends each $f: [0, r] \to X$ to $f(r)$ and $\Omega' X = p^{-1}(*)$ is the fiber. It turns out that $\Omega X$ and $\Omega' X$ are homotopy equivalent.

Now, we define the product map

$$\mu: P' X \times \Omega' X \to P' X$$

by: for $f\colon [0, r] \to X$ and $g\colon [0, s] \to X$,

$$\mu(g, f)(t)=
\begin{cases}
f(t) & \text{if } 0 \le t \le r \\
g(t-r) & \text{if } r \le t \le s + r \\
\end{cases}$$.

This product is manifestly associative. In particular, with μ restricted to Ω'X × Ω'X, we have that Ω'X is a topological monoid (in the category of all spaces). Moreover, this monoid Ω'X acts on P'X through the original μ. In fact, $p: P'X \to X$ is an Ω'X-fibration.
