= Fiber-homotopy equivalence =

In algebraic topology, a fiber-homotopy equivalence is a map over a space B that has homotopy inverse over B (that is if $h_t$ is a homotopy between the two maps, $h_t$ is a map over B for t.) It is a relative analog of a homotopy equivalence between spaces.

Given maps p: D → B, q: E → B, if ƒ: D → E is a fiber-homotopy equivalence, then for any b in B the restriction

$$f: p^{-1}(b) \to q^{-1}(b)$$

is a homotopy equivalence. If p, q are fibrations, this is always the case for homotopy equivalences by the next proposition.

Proposition— Let $p: D \to B, q: E \to B$ be fibrations. Then a map $f: D \to E$ over B is a homotopy equivalence if and only if it is a fiber-homotopy equivalence.

There is also a completely analogous notion of a cofiber-homotopy equivalence, a homotopy equivalence such that the homotopies connecting the compositions and the identities are homotopies under the base. Then, similar to the above, we have:

Proposition— Let $i: A \to X, j : A \to Y$ be cofibrations. Then a map $f: X \to Y$ under A is a homotopy equivalence if and only if it is a cofiber-homotopy equivalence.

== Proof of the proposition ==
The following proof is based on the proof of Proposition in Ch. 6, § 5 of (May 1999). We write $\sim_B$ for a homotopy over B.

We first note that it is enough to show that ƒ admits a left homotopy inverse over B. Indeed, if $g f \sim_{B} \operatorname{id}$ with g over B, then g is in particular a homotopy equivalence. Thus, g also admits a left homotopy inverse h over B and then formally we have $h \sim f$; that is, $f g \sim_{B} \operatorname{id}$.

Now, since ƒ is a homotopy equivalence, it has a homotopy inverse g. Since $fg \sim \operatorname{id}$, we have: $pg = qfg \sim q$. Since p is a fibration, the homotopy $pg \sim q$ lifts to a homotopy from g to, say, g' that satisfies $pg' = q$. Thus, we can assume g is over B. Then it suffices to show gƒ, which is now over B, has a left homotopy inverse over B since that would imply that ƒ has such a left inverse.

Therefore, the proof reduces to the situation where ƒ: D → D is over B via p and $f \sim \operatorname{id}_D$. Let $h_t$ be a homotopy from ƒ to $\operatorname{id}_D$. Then, since $p h_0 = p$ and since p is a fibration, the homotopy $ph_t$ lifts to a homotopy $k_t: \operatorname{id}_D \sim k_1$; explicitly, we have $p h_t = p k_t$. Note also $k_1$ is over B.

We show $k_1$ is a left homotopy inverse of ƒ over B. Let $J: k_1 f \sim h_1 = \operatorname{id}_D$ be the homotopy given as the composition of homotopies $k_1 f \sim f = h_0 \sim \operatorname{id}_D$. Then we can find a homotopy K from the homotopy pJ to the constant homotopy $p k_1 = p h_1$. Since p is a fibration, we can lift K to, say, L. We can finish by going around the edge corresponding to J:

$$k_1 f = J_0 = L_{0, 0} \sim_B L_{0, 1} \sim_B L_{1, 1} \sim_B L_{1, 0} = J_1 = \operatorname{id}.$$
