= Homotopy fiber =

Topological construction defined up to homotopy

In mathematics, especially homotopy theory, the homotopy fiber (sometimes called the mapping fiber) is part of a construction that associates a fibration to an arbitrary continuous function of topological spaces $f:A \to B$. It acts as a homotopy theoretic kernel of a mapping of topological spaces due to the fact it yields a long exact sequence of homotopy groups

$\cdots \to \pi_{n+1}(B) \to \pi_n(\text{Hofiber}(f)) \to \pi_n(A) \to \pi_n(B) \to \cdots$

Moreover, the homotopy fiber can be found in other contexts, such as homological algebra, where the distinguished triangle

$C(f)_\bullet[-1] \to A_\bullet \to B_\bullet \xrightarrow{[+1]}$

gives a long exact sequence analogous to the long exact sequence of homotopy groups. There is a dual construction called the homotopy cofiber.

== Construction ==
The homotopy fiber has a simple description for a continuous map $f:A \to B$. If we replace $f$ by a fibration, then the homotopy fiber is simply the fiber of the replacement fibration. We recall this construction of replacing a map by a fibration:

Given such a map, we can replace it with a fibration by defining the mapping path space $E_f$ to be the set of pairs $(a,\gamma)$ where $a \in A$ and $\gamma:I \to B$ (for $I = [0,1]$) a path such that $\gamma(0) = f(a)$. We give $E_f$ a topology by giving it the subspace topology as a subset of $A\times B^I$ (where $B^I$ is the space of paths in $B$ which as a function space has the compact-open topology). Then the map $E_f \to B$ given by $(a,\gamma) \mapsto \gamma(1)$ is a fibration. Furthermore, $E_f$ is homotopy equivalent to $A$ as follows: Embed $A$ as a subspace of $E_f$ by $a \mapsto \gamma_a$ where $\gamma_a$ is the constant path at $f(a)$. Then $E_f$ deformation retracts to this subspace by contracting the paths.

The fiber of this fibration (which is only well-defined up to homotopy equivalence) is the homotopy fiber

$$\begin{matrix}
\text{Hofiber}(f) &\to & E_f \\
& & \downarrow \\
& & B
\end{matrix}$$

which can be defined as the set of all $(a,\gamma)$ with $a \in A$ and $\gamma:I \to B$ a path such that $\gamma(0) = f(a)$ and $\gamma(1) = *$ for some fixed basepoint $* \in B$. A consequence of this definition is that if two points of $B$ are in the same path connected component, then their homotopy fibers are homotopy equivalent.

=== As a homotopy limit ===
Another way to construct the homotopy fiber of a map is to consider the homotopy limit^{pg 21} of the diagram

$$\underset{\leftarrow}{\text{holim}}\left(\begin{matrix}
& & * \\
& & \downarrow \\
A & \xrightarrow{f} & B
\end{matrix}\right)
\simeq F_f$$

this is because computing the homotopy limit amounts to finding the pullback of the diagram

$$\begin{matrix}
& & B^I \\
& & \downarrow \\
A \times * & \xrightarrow{f} & B\times B
\end{matrix}$$

where the vertical map is the source and target map of a path $\gamma: I \to B$, so

$\gamma \mapsto (\gamma(0), \gamma(1))$

This means the homotopy limit is in the collection of maps

$\left\{(a, \gamma) \in A \times B^I : f(a) = \gamma(0) \text{ and } \gamma(1) = *\right\}$

which is exactly the homotopy fiber as defined above.

If $x_0$ and $x_1$ can be connected by a path $\delta$ in $B$, then the diagrams

$$\begin{matrix}
& & x_0 \\
& & \downarrow \\
A & \xrightarrow{f} & B
\end{matrix}$$

and

$$\begin{matrix}
& & x_1 \\
& & \downarrow \\
A & \xrightarrow{f} & B
\end{matrix}$$

are homotopy equivalent to the diagram

$$\begin{matrix}
& & [0,1] \\
& & \downarrow{\delta} \\
A & \xrightarrow{f} & B
\end{matrix}$$

and thus the homotopy fibers of $x_0$ and $x_1$ are isomorphic in $\text{hoTop}$. Therefore we often speak about the homotopy fiber of a map without specifying a base point.

== Properties ==
=== Homotopy fiber of a fibration ===
In the special case that the original map $f$ was a fibration with fiber $F$, then the homotopy equivalence $A \to E_f$ given above will be a map of fibrations over $B$. This will induce a morphism of their long exact sequences of homotopy groups, from which (by applying the Five Lemma, as is done in the Puppe sequence) one can see that the map F → F_{f} is a weak equivalence. Thus the above given construction reproduces the same homotopy type if there already is one.

=== Duality with mapping cone ===
The homotopy fiber is dual to the mapping cone, much as the mapping path space is dual to the mapping cylinder.

== Examples ==
=== Loop space ===
Given a topological space $X$ and the inclusion of a point

$\iota: \{x_0\} \hookrightarrow X$

the homotopy fiber of this map is then

$\left\{(x_0, \gamma) \in \{x_0\} \times X^I : x_0 = \gamma(0) \text{ and } \gamma(1) = x_0\right\}$

which is the loop space $\Omega X$.

See also: Path space fibration.

=== From a covering space ===
Given a universal covering

$\pi:\tilde{X} \to X$

the homotopy fiber $\text{Hofiber}(\pi)$ has the property

$$\pi_{k}(\text{Hofiber}(\pi)) = \begin{cases}
\pi_1(X) & k = 0  \\
0 & k \geq 1
\end{cases}$$

which can be seen by looking at the long exact sequence of the homotopy groups for the fibration. This is analyzed further below by looking at the Whitehead tower.

== Applications ==
=== Postnikov tower ===
One main application of the homotopy fiber is in the construction of the Postnikov tower. For a (nice enough) topological space $X$, we can construct a sequence of spaces $\left\{X_n\right\}_{n \geq 0}$ and maps $f_n: X_n \to X_{n-1}$ where

$$\pi_k\left(X_n\right) = \begin{cases}
\pi_k(X) & k \leq n \\
0 & \text{ otherwise }
\end{cases}$$

and

$X \simeq \underset{\leftarrow}{\text{lim}}\left(X_k\right)$

Now, these maps $f_n$ can be iteratively constructed using homotopy fibers. This is because we can take a map

$X_{n-1} \to K\left(\pi_n(X), n - 1\right)$

representing a cohomology class in

$H^{n-1}\left(X_{n-1}, \pi_n(X)\right)$

and construct the homotopy fiber

$$\underset{\leftarrow}{\text{holim}}\left(\begin{matrix}
&& * \\
&& \downarrow \\
X_{n-1} & \xrightarrow{f} & K\left(\pi_n(X), n - 1\right)
\end{matrix}\right)
\simeq X_n$$

In addition, notice the homotopy fiber of $f_n: X_n \to X_{n-1}$ is

$\text{Hofiber}\left(f_n\right) \simeq K\left(\pi_n(X), n\right)$

showing the homotopy fiber acts like a homotopy-theoretic kernel. Note this fact can be shown by looking at the long exact sequence for the fibration constructing the homotopy fiber.

=== Maps from the Whitehead tower ===
The dual notion of the Postnikov tower is the Whitehead tower which gives a sequence of spaces $\{X^n\}_{n \geq 0}$ and maps $f^n: X^n \to X^{n-1}$ where

$$\pi_k\left(X^n\right) = \begin{cases}
\pi_k(X) & k \geq n \\
0 & \text{otherwise}
\end{cases}$$

hence $X^0 \simeq X$. If we take the induced map

$f^{n+1}_0: X^{n+1} \to X$

the homotopy fiber of this map recovers the $n$-th postnikov approximation $X_n$ since the long exact sequence of the fibration

$$\begin{matrix}
\text{Hofiber}\left(f^{n+1}_0\right) & \to & X^{n+1} \\
&& \downarrow \\
&& X
\end{matrix}$$

we get

$$\begin{matrix}
\to & \pi_{k+1}\left(\text{Hofiber}\left(f^{n+1}_0\right)\right) & \to & \pi_{k+1}(X^{n+1})            & \to & \pi_{k+1}(X) & \to \\
& \pi_{k}\left(\text{Hofiber}\left(f^{n+1}_0\right)\right)   & \to & \pi_{k}\left(X^{n+1}\right)   & \to & \pi_{k}(X)   & \to \\
& \pi_{k-1}\left(\text{Hofiber}\left(f^{n+1}_0\right)\right) & \to & \pi_{k-1}\left(X^{n+1}\right) & \to & \pi_{k-1}(X) & \to
\end{matrix}$$

which gives isomorphisms

$\pi_{k-1}\left(\text{Hofiber}\left(f^{n+1}_0\right)\right) \cong \pi_k(X)$

for $k \leq n$.

== See also ==
- Homotopy cofiber
- Quasi-fibration
- Adams resolution
