= Inclusion map =

Set-theoretic function

$A$ is a subset of $B,$ and $B$ is a superset of $A.$

In mathematics, if $A$ is a subset of $B,$ then the inclusion map is the function $\iota$ that sends each element $x$ of $A$ to $x,$ treated as an element of $B:$
$$\iota : A\rightarrow B, \qquad \iota(x)=x.$$

An inclusion map may also be referred to as an inclusion function, an insertion, or a canonical injection.

A "hooked arrow" (U+21AA ↪ RIGHTWARDS ARROW WITH HOOK) is sometimes used in place of the function arrow above to denote an inclusion map; thus:
$$\iota: A\hookrightarrow B.$$

(However, some authors use this hooked arrow for any embedding.)

This and other analogous injective functions from substructures are sometimes called natural injections.

Given any morphism $f$ between objects $X$ and $Y$, if there is an inclusion map $\iota : A \to X$ into the domain $X$, then one can form the restriction $f\circ \iota$ of $f.$ In many instances, one can also construct a canonical inclusion into the codomain $R \to Y$ known as the range of $f.$

== Applications of inclusion maps ==
Inclusion maps tend to be homomorphisms of algebraic structures; thus, such inclusion maps are embeddings. More precisely, given a substructure closed under some operations, the inclusion map will be an embedding for tautological reasons. For example, for some binary operation $\star,$ to require that
$$\iota(x\star y) = \iota(x) \star \iota(y)$$
is simply to say that $\star$ is consistently computed in the sub-structure and the large structure. The case of a unary operation is similar; but one should also look at nullary operations, which pick out a constant element. Here the point is that closure means such constants must already be given in the substructure.

Inclusion maps are seen in algebraic topology where if $A$ is a strong deformation retract of $X,$ the inclusion map yields an isomorphism between all homotopy groups (that is, it is a homotopy equivalence).

Inclusion maps in geometry come in different kinds: for example embeddings of submanifolds. Contravariant objects (which is to say, objects that have pullbacks; these are called covariant in an older and unrelated terminology) such as differential forms restrict to submanifolds, giving a mapping in the other direction. Another example, more sophisticated, is that of affine schemes, for which the inclusions
$$\operatorname{Spec}\left(R/I\right) \to \operatorname{Spec}(R)$$
and
$$\operatorname{Spec}\left(R/I^2\right) \to \operatorname{Spec}(R)$$
may be different morphisms, where $R$ is a commutative ring and $I$ is an ideal of $R.$

== See also ==
- Cofibration – Concept in homotopy theory
- Identity function – Function that returns its argument unchanged
