= Mapping cone (topology) =

Topological construction on a map between spaces

An illustration of a mapping cone; that is, a cone is glued to a space along some function $f \colon X \to Y$.

In mathematics, especially homotopy theory, the mapping cone is a construction in topology analogous to a quotient space and denoted $C_f$. Alternatively, it is also called the homotopy cofiber and also notated $Cf$. Its dual, a fibration, is called the mapping fiber. The mapping cone can be understood to be a mapping cylinder $Mf$ with the initial end of the cylinder collapsed to a point. Mapping cones are frequently applied in the homotopy theory of pointed spaces.

== Definition ==
Given a map $f\colon X \to Y$, the mapping cone $C_f$ is defined to be the quotient space of the mapping cylinder $(X \times I) \sqcup_f Y$ with respect to the equivalence relation $\forall x,x' \in X, (x, 0) \sim \left(x', 0\right)\,$, $(x, 1) \sim f(x)$. Here $I$ denotes the unit interval [0, 1] with its standard topology. Note that some authors (like J. Peter May) use the opposite convention, switching 0 and 1.

Visually, one takes the cone on X (the cylinder $X \times I$ with one end (the 0 end) collapsed to a point), and glues the other end onto Y via the map f (the 1 end).

The above is the definition for a map of unpointed spaces; for a map of pointed spaces $f\colon (X, x_0) \to (Y, y_0)$ (so $f\colon x_0 \mapsto y_0$), one also identifies all of $x_0 \times I$. Formally, $(x_0, t) \sim \left(x_0, t'\right)$. Thus one end and the "seam" are all identified with $y_0.$

=== Example of circle ===
If $X$ is the circle $S^1$, the mapping cone $C_f$ can be considered as the quotient space of the disjoint union of Y with the disk $D^2$ formed by identifying each point x on the boundary of $D^2$ to the point $f(x)$ in Y.

Consider, for example, the case where Y is the disk $D^2$, and $f\colon S^1 \to Y = D^2$ is the standard inclusion of the circle $S^1$ as the boundary of $D^2$. Then the mapping cone $C_f$ is homeomorphic to two disks joined on their boundary, which is topologically the sphere $S^2$.

=== Double mapping cylinder ===
The mapping cone is a special case of the double mapping cylinder. This is basically a cylinder $X \times I$ joined on one end to a space $Y_1$ via a map

$$f_1: X \to Y_1$$

and joined on the other end to a space $Y_2$ via a map

$$f_2: X \to Y_2$$

The mapping cone is the degenerate case of the double mapping cylinder (also known as the homotopy pushout), in which one of $Y_1, Y_2$ is a single point.

== Dual construction: the mapping fibre ==
The dual to the mapping cone is the mapping fibre $F_f$. Given the pointed map $f\colon (X, x_0) \to (Y, y_0),$ one defines the mapping fiber as

$$F_f = \left\{(x, \omega) \in X \times Y^I : \omega(0) = y_0 \mbox{ and } \omega(1) = f(x)\right\}$$.

Here, I is the unit interval and $\omega$ is a continuous path in the space (the exponential object) $Y^I$. The mapping fiber is sometimes denoted as $Mf$; however this conflicts with the same notation for the mapping cylinder.

It is dual to the mapping cone in the sense that the product above is essentially the fibered product or pullback $X\times_f Y$ which is dual to the pushout $X\sqcup_f Y$ used to construct the mapping cone. In this particular case, the duality is essentially that of currying, in that the mapping cone $(X\times I)\sqcup_f Y$ has the curried form $X \times_f (I\to Y)$ where $I\to Y$ is simply an alternate notation for the space $Y^I$ of all continuous maps from the unit interval to $Y$. The two variants are related by an adjoint functor. Observe that the currying preserves the reduced nature of the maps: in the one case, to the tip of the cone, and in the other case, paths to the basepoint.

== Applications ==
=== CW-complexes ===
Attaching a cell.

=== Effect on fundamental group ===
Given a space X and a loop $\alpha\colon S^1 \to X$ representing an element of the fundamental group of X, we can form the mapping cone $C_\alpha$. The effect of this is to make the loop $\alpha$ contractible in $C_\alpha$, and therefore the equivalence class of $\alpha$ in the fundamental group of $C_\alpha$ will be simply the identity element.

Given a group presentation by generators and relations, one gets a 2-complex with that fundamental group.

=== Homology of a pair ===
The mapping cone lets one interpret the homology of a pair as the reduced homology of the quotient. Namely, if E is a homology theory, and $i\colon A \to X$ is a cofibration, then

$$E_*(X,A) = E_*(X/A,*) = \tilde E_*(X/A)$$,

which follows by applying excision to the mapping cone.

== Relation to homotopy (homology) equivalences ==
A map $f\colon X\rightarrow Y$ between simply-connected CW complexes is a homotopy equivalence if and only if its mapping cone is contractible.

More generally, a map is called n-connected (as a map) if its mapping cone is n-connected (as a space), plus a little more.

Let $\mathbb{}H_*$ be a fixed homology theory. The map $f\colon X\rightarrow Y$ induces isomorphisms on $H_*$, if and only if the map $\{pt\}\hookrightarrow C_f$ induces an isomorphism on $H_*$, i.e., $H_*(C_f,pt)=0$.

Mapping cones are famously used to construct the long coexact Puppe sequences, from which long exact sequences of homotopy and relative homotopy groups can be obtained.

== See also ==
- Cofibration
- Mapping cone (homological algebra)
