= Cellular approximation theorem =

In algebraic topology, the cellular approximation theorem states that a map between CW-complexes can always be taken to be of a specific type. Concretely, if X and Y are CW-complexes, and f : X → Y is a continuous map, then f is said to be cellular if f takes the n-skeleton of X to the n-skeleton of Y for all n, i.e. if $f(X^n)\subseteq Y^n$ for all n. The cellular approximation theorem states that any continuous map f : X → Y between CW-complexes X and Y is homotopic to a cellular map, and if f is already cellular on a subcomplex A of X, then we can furthermore choose the homotopy to be stationary on A. From an algebraic topological viewpoint, any map between CW-complexes can thus be taken to be cellular.

== Idea of proof ==
The proof can be given by induction after n, with the statement that f is cellular on the skeleton X^{n}. For the base case n=0, notice that every path-component of Y must contain a 0-cell. The image under f of a 0-cell of X can thus be connected to a 0-cell of Y by a path, but this gives a homotopy from f to a map which is cellular on the 0-skeleton of X.

Assume inductively that f is cellular on the (n − 1)-skeleton of X, and let e^{n} be an n-cell of X. The closure of e^{n} is compact in X, being the image of the characteristic map of the cell, and hence the image of the closure of e^{n} under f is also compact in Y. Then it is a general result of CW-complexes that any compact subspace of a CW-complex meets (that is, intersects non-trivially) only finitely many cells of the complex. Thus f(e^{n}) meets at most finitely many cells of Y, so we can take $e^k\subseteq Y$ to be a cell of highest dimension meeting f(e^{n}). If $k\leq n$, the map f is already cellular on e^{n}, since in this case only cells of the n-skeleton of Y meets f(e^{n}), so we may assume that k > n. It is then a technical, non-trivial result (see Hatcher) that the restriction of f to $X^{n-1}\cup e^n$ can be homotoped relative to X^{n-1} to a map missing a point p ∈ e^{k}. Since Y^{k} − {p} deformation retracts onto the subspace Y^{k}-e^{k}, we can further homotope the restriction of f to $X^{n-1}\cup e^n$ to a map, say, g, with the property that g(e^{n}) misses the cell e^{k} of Y, still relative to X^{n-1}. Since f(e^{n}) met only finitely many cells of Y to begin with, we can repeat this process finitely many times to make $f(e^n)$ miss all cells of Y of dimension larger than n.

We repeat this process for every n-cell of X, fixing cells of the subcomplex A on which f is already cellular, and we thus obtain a homotopy (relative to the (n − 1)-skeleton of X and the n-cells of A) of the restriction of f to X^{n} to a map cellular on all cells of X of dimension at most n. Using then the homotopy extension property to extend this to a homotopy on all of X, and patching these homotopies together, will finish the proof. For details, consult Hatcher.

== Applications ==
=== Some homotopy groups ===
The cellular approximation theorem can be used to immediately calculate some homotopy groups. In particular, if $n<k,$ then $\pi_n(S^k)=0.$ Give $S^n$ and $S^k$ their canonical CW-structure, with one 0-cell each, and with one n-cell for $S^n$ and one k-cell for $S^k.$ Any base-point preserving map $f\colon S^n \to S^k$ is then homotopic to a map whose image lies in the n-skeleton of $S^k,$ which consists of the base point only. That is, any such map is nullhomotopic.

=== Cellular approximation for pairs ===
Let f:(X,A)→(Y,B) be a map of CW-pairs, that is, f is a map from X to Y, and the image of $A\subseteq X \,$ under f sits inside B. Then f is homotopic to a cellular map (X,A)→(Y,B). To see this, restrict f to A and use cellular approximation to obtain a homotopy of f to a cellular map on A. Use the homotopy extension property to extend this homotopy to all of X, and apply cellular approximation again to obtain a map cellular on X, but without violating the cellular property on A.

As a consequence, we have that a CW-pair (X,A) is n-connected, if all cells of $X-A$ have dimension strictly greater than n: If $i\leq n \,$, then any map $(D^i,\partial D^i) \,$→(X,A) is homotopic to a cellular map of pairs, and since the n-skeleton of X sits inside A, any such map is homotopic to a map whose image is in A, and hence it is 0 in the relative homotopy group $\pi_i(X,A) \,$.
We have in particular that $(X,X^n)\,$ is n-connected, so it follows from the long exact sequence of homotopy groups for the pair $(X,X^n) \,$ that we have isomorphisms $\pi_i(X^n) \,$→$\pi_i(X) \,$ for all $i<n \,$ and a surjection $\pi_n(X^n) \,$→$\pi_n(X) \,$.

=== CW approximation ===
For every space X one can construct a CW complex Z and a weak homotopy equivalence $f \colon Z\to X$ that is called a CW approximation to X. CW approximation, being a weak homotopy equivalence, induces isomorphisms on homology and cohomology groups of X. Thus one often can use CW approximation to reduce a general statement to a simpler version that only concerns CW complexes.

CW approximation is constructed inducting on skeleta $Z_i$ of $Z$, so that the maps $(f_i)_*\colon \pi_k (Z_i)\to \pi_k(X)$ are isomorphic for $k< i$ and are onto for $k=i$ (for any basepoint). Then $Z_{i+1}$ is built from $Z_i$ by attaching (i+1)-cells that (for all basepoints)

- are attached by the mappings $S^i \to Z_i$ that generate the kernel of $\pi_i (Z_i)\to \pi_i(X)$ (and are mapped to X by the contraction of the corresponding spheroids)
- are attached by constant mappings and are mapped to X to generate $\pi_{i+1}(X)$ (or $\pi_{i+1}(X)/(f_i)_* (\pi_{i+1} (Z_i))$ ).

The cellular approximation ensures then that adding (i+1)-cells doesn't affect $\pi_k (Z_i)\stackrel{\cong}{\to} \pi_k (X)$ for $k<i$, while $\pi_i (Z_i)$ gets factored by the classes of the attachment mappings $S^i \to Z_i$ of these cells giving $\pi_i (Z_{i+1})\stackrel{\cong}{\to} \pi_i (X)$. Surjectivity of $\pi_{i+1} (Z_{i+1})\to \pi_{i+1} (X)$ is evident from the second step of the construction.
