= Wedge product (topology) =

The wedge product in topology may refer to:

- The wedge sum, which joins two spaces at a point
- The smash product, the product in the category of pointed spaces
