= Euclidean neighborhood retract =

In mathematics, especially algebraic topology, a Euclidean neighborhood retract or an ENR for short is a topological space that is (or homeomorphic to) a subset of a Euclidean space $\mathbb{R}^n$, some n, that is a retract of some neighborhood of the subset.

== Definition and results ==
By definition, a topological space X is called a Euclidean neighborhood retract or an ENR if there is an embedding $i : X \hookrightarrow \mathbb{R}^n$ for some n such that $i(X)$ is a retract of some neighborhood $U$ of it; i.e., there is a map $r : U \to i(X)$ such that $r|_{i(X)}$ is the identity (such $r$ is called a retraction). It follows that an ENR is necessarily locally compact and locally contractible in geometric topology sense.

The fundamental result here is the following

Theorem (Borsuk)— Let X be a locally compact and locally contractible space. If there is an embedding $i : X \hookrightarrow \mathbb{R}^n,$ then there is a retraction from some neighborhood U to $i(X)$.

The theorem implies in particular that the above retract map r in the definition is actually not part of the data of the definition of an ENR. The theorem also implies many familiar spaces are ENRs; e.g., a topological manifold, a finite CW-complex, a real semi-algebraic set are all ENRs. A subset of $\mathbb{R}^n$ that is not locally compact, like $\mathbb{Q}^n$, is a non-example of an ENR.

== See also ==
- Absolute neighborhood retract
