= Absolute neighborhood retract =

Math concept

In mathematics, especially algebraic topology, an absolute neighborhood retract (or ANR) is a "nice" topological space that is considered in homotopy theory; more specifically, in the theory of retracts. (Note: A retraction is a continuous mapping from a topological space into a subspace that preserves the position of all points in that subspace.)

For a more general introduction to ANRs, see also Retraction (topology)#Absolute neighborhood retract (ANR). This article focuses more on results on ANRs.

== Definitions ==
Given a class $\mathfrak c$ of topological spaces, an absolute retract for $\mathfrak c$ is a topological space $X$ in $\mathfrak c$ such that for each closed embedding $X \hookrightarrow Y$ into a space $Y$ in $\mathfrak c$, $X$ (that is, the image of $X$) is a retract of $Y$.

An absolute neighborhood retract or ANR for $\mathfrak c$ is a topological space $X$ in $\mathfrak c$ such that for each closed embedding $X \hookrightarrow Y$ into a space $Y$ in $\mathfrak c$, $X$ is a retract of a neighborhood in $Y$. In literature, it is the most common to take $\mathfrak c$ to be the class of metric spaces or separable metric spaces. The notion of ANRs is due to Borsuk.

A closely related notion is that of an absolute extensor; namely, an absolute extensor is a topological space $X$ such that for each $Y$ in $\mathfrak c$ and a closed subset $A \subset Y$, each continuous map $A \to X$ extends to $Y \to X$. An absolute neighborhood extensor is defined similarly by requiring the existence of an extension only to a neighborhood of $A$.

== Results ==
The next theorem characterizes an ANR in terms of the extension property.

Theorem— The following are equivalent for a metric space $Y$:

1. $Y$ is an ANR for metric spaces.
2. There is an embedding $Y \hookrightarrow E$ into a normed linear space such that $Y$ is a retract of a neighborhood in the convex hull of the image of $Y$.
3. For each metric space $X$ and closed subset $A \subset X$, each $A \to Y$ extends to a neighborhood of $A$; in short, $Y$ is an absolute neighborhood extensor.

This is a consequence of Dugundji's extension theorem and the Eilenberg–Wojdysławski theorem. Indeed, the latter theorem says every metric space embeds into a normed space as a closed subset of the convex hull of the image. This gives $1 \Rightarrow 2$. Assuming $Y \subset U \subset K =$ the convex hull of $Y$ and a retraction $r : U \to Y$ exists, by Dugundji's extension theorem, each $A \to Y \subset K$ extends to $g : X \to K$. Then $g^{-1}(U) \overset{g}\to U \overset{r}\to Y$ is a required extension. Finally, $3 \Rightarrow 1$ holds by taking $A = Y$. $\square$

There is also the notion of a local ANR, a metric space in which each point has a neighborhood that is an ANR. But as it turns out, the two notions ANR and local ANR coincide. In particular, a topological manifold is an ANR (even strongly it is a Euclidean neighborhood retract.)

There is also the following type of the approximation theorem

Theorem— Let $Y$ be an ANR and $\alpha$ an open cover of $Y$. Then there exists a refinement $\beta$ of $\alpha$ with the property: if two maps $f, g : X \to Y$ from a separable metric space are $\beta$-near in the sense $f^{-1}(U) \cap g^{-1}(U), U \in \beta$ is an open cover of $Y$, then there is an $\alpha$-homotopy $h_t$ between them; i.e., $h_0, h_1 = f, g$ and for each $x$ in $X$, $h_I(x) \subset$ some open set in $\alpha$. Moreover, $\beta$ has the property: if a priori a $\beta$-homotopy $f|A \sim g|A$ is given for some closed subset $A$, then the above homotopy can be taken to be an extension of that.

Conversely, a separable metric space $Y$ is an ANR if there exists an open cover $\alpha$ of $Y$ with the property: for a pair of $\alpha$-near maps $f, g: X \to Y$, each $\alpha$-homotopy $f|A \sim g|A$ extends to a homotopy $f \sim g$.

The theorem in particular implies that an ANR is locally contractible in the geometric topology sense; i.e., given a neighborhood $V$ of a point, the natural inclusion from some smaller neighborhood of the same point $V \hookrightarrow U$ is nullhomotopic. On the other hand, Borsuk has given an example of a locally contractible space that is not an ANR. What we can say is: if $X$ is a locally contractible separable metric space and the homotopy extension theorem holds for it, then $X$ is an ANR.

An n-dimensional metric space is an ANR if and only if it is locally connected up to dimension n in the sense of Lefschetz.

A topological space has the homotopy type of a countable CW-complex if and only if it has the homotopy type of an absolute neighborhood retract for separable metric spaces.

An open subset of a CW-complex may not be a CW-complex (due to Cauty). However, Cauty showed that a metric space is an ANR if and only if each open subset has the homotopy type of an ANR or equivalently the homtopy type of a CW-complex.

== ANR homology manifold ==
An ANR homology manifold of dimension n is a finite-dimensional ANR such that for each point $x$ in $X$, the homology $\operatorname{H}_*(X, X - {x})$ has $\mathbb{Z}$ at n and zero elsewhere.
