= Cellular homology =

Theory in algebraic topology

In mathematics, cellular homology in algebraic topology is a homology theory for the category of CW-complexes. It agrees with singular homology, and can provide an effective means of computing homology modules.

== Definition ==
If $X$ is a CW-complex with n-skeleton $X_{n}$, the cellular-homology modules are defined as the homology groups H_{i} of the cellular chain complex

$$\cdots \to {H_{n + 1}}(X_{n + 1},X_{n}) \to {H_{n}}(X_{n},X_{n - 1}) \to {H_{n - 1}}(X_{n - 1},X_{n - 2}) \to \cdots,$$

where $X_{-1}$ is taken to be the empty set.

The group

$${H_{n}}(X_{n},X_{n - 1})$$

is free abelian, with generators that can be identified with the $n$-cells of $X$. Let $e_{n}^{\alpha}$ be an $n$-cell of $X$, and let $\chi_{n}^{\alpha}: \partial e_{n}^{\alpha} \cong \mathbb{S}^{n - 1} \to X_{n-1}$ be the attaching map. Then consider the composition

$$\chi_{n}^{\alpha \beta}:
\mathbb{S}^{n - 1}                                               \, \stackrel{\cong}{\longrightarrow} \,
\partial e_{n}^{\alpha}                                          \, \stackrel{\chi_{n}^{\alpha}}{\longrightarrow} \,
X_{n - 1}                                                        \, \stackrel{q}{\longrightarrow} \,
X_{n - 1} / ( X_{n - 1} \setminus e_{n - 1}^{\beta} ) \, \stackrel{\cong}{\longrightarrow} \,
\mathbb{S}^{n - 1},$$

where the first map identifies $\mathbb{S}^{n - 1}$ with $\partial e_{n}^{\alpha}$ via the characteristic map $\Phi_{n}^{\alpha}$ of $e_{n}^{\alpha}$, the object $e_{n - 1}^{\beta}$ is an $(n - 1)$-cell of X, the third map $q$ is the quotient map that collapses $X_{n - 1} \setminus e_{n - 1}^{\beta}$ to a point (thus wrapping $e_{n - 1}^{\beta}$ into a sphere $\mathbb{S}^{n - 1}$), and the last map identifies $X_{n - 1} / ( X_{n - 1} \setminus e_{n - 1}^{\beta} )$ with $\mathbb{S}^{n - 1}$ via the characteristic map $\Phi_{n - 1}^{\beta}$ of $e_{n - 1}^{\beta}$.

The boundary map

$$\partial_{n}: {H_{n}}(X_{n},X_{n - 1}) \to {H_{n - 1}}(X_{n - 1},X_{n - 2})$$

is then given by the formula

$${\partial_{n}}(e_{n}^{\alpha}) = \sum_{\beta} \deg ( \chi_{n}^{\alpha \beta} ) e_{n - 1}^{\beta},$$

where $\deg ( \chi_{n}^{\alpha \beta} )$ is the degree of $\chi_{n}^{\alpha \beta}$ and the sum is taken over all $(n - 1)$-cells of $X$, considered as generators of ${H_{n - 1}}(X_{n - 1},X_{n - 2})$.

== Examples ==
The following examples illustrate why computations done with cellular homology are often more efficient than those calculated by using singular homology alone.

=== The n-sphere ===
The n-dimensional sphere S^{n} admits a CW structure with two cells, one 0-cell and one n-cell. Here the n-cell is attached by the constant mapping from $S^{n-1}$ to the 0-cell. Since the generators of the cellular chain groups ${H_{k}}(S^n_{k},S^{n}_{k - 1})$ can be identified with the k-cells of S^{n}, we have that ${H_{k}}(S^n_{k},S^{n}_{k - 1})=\Z$ for $k = 0, n,$ and is otherwise trivial.

Hence for $n>1$, the resulting chain complex is

$$\dotsb\overset{\partial_{n+2}}{\longrightarrow\,}0
\overset{\partial_{n+1}}{\longrightarrow\,}\Z
\overset{\partial_n}{\longrightarrow\,}0
\overset{\partial_{n-1}}{\longrightarrow\,}
\dotsb
\overset{\partial_2}{\longrightarrow\,}
0
\overset{\partial_1}{\longrightarrow\,}
\Z {\longrightarrow\,}
0,$$

but then as all the boundary maps are either to or from trivial groups, they must all be zero, meaning that the cellular homology groups are equal to

$$H_k(S^n) = \begin{cases} \mathbb Z & k=0, n \\ \{0\} & \text{otherwise.} \end{cases}$$

When $n=1$, it is possible to verify that the boundary map $\partial_1$ is zero, meaning the above formula holds for all positive $n$.

=== Genus g surface ===
Cellular homology can also be used to calculate the homology of the genus g surface $\Sigma_g$. The fundamental polygon of $\Sigma_g$ is a $4g$-gon which gives $\Sigma_g$ a CW-structure with one 2-cell, $2g$ 1-cells, and one 0-cell. The 2-cell is attached along the boundary of the $4g$-gon, which contains every 1-cell twice, once forwards and once backwards. This means the attaching map is zero, since the forwards and backwards directions of each 1-cell cancel out. Similarly, the attaching map for each 1-cell is also zero, since it is the constant mapping from $S^0$ to the 0-cell. Therefore, the resulting chain complex is

$$\cdots \to 0 \xrightarrow{\partial_3} \mathbb{Z} \xrightarrow{\partial_2} \mathbb{Z}^{2g} \xrightarrow{\partial_1} \mathbb{Z} \to 0,$$

where all the boundary maps are zero. Therefore, this means the cellular homology of the genus g surface is given by

$$H_k(\Sigma_g) = \begin{cases} \mathbb{Z} & k = 0,2 \\ \mathbb{Z}^{2g} & k = 1 \\ \{0\} & \text{otherwise.} \end{cases}$$

Similarly, one can construct the genus g surface with a crosscap attached (a non-orientable genus g surface) as a CW complex with one 0-cell, g 1-cells $\{a_1, \dotsc, a_g\}$, and one 2-cell which is attached along the word $a_1^1\dotsm a_g^2$. Therefore, the resulting chain complex is:

$\cdots \to 0 \xrightarrow{\partial_3} \mathbb{Z} \xrightarrow{\partial_2} \mathbb{Z}^{g} \xrightarrow{\partial_1} \mathbb{Z} \to 0,$

where the boundary maps are $\partial_3=\partial_1 =0$ and $\partial_2(1)=2a_1+2a_2+\dotsm + 2a_g = 2(a_1+\dotsm+a_g)$.

Its homology groups are
$$H_k(N_g) = \begin{cases} \mathbb{Z} & k = 0 \\ \mathbb{Z}^{g-1} \oplus \Z_2 & k = 1 \\ \{0\} & \text{otherwise.} \end{cases}$$

=== Torus ===
The n-torus $(S^1)^n$ can be constructed as the CW complex with one 0-cell, n 1-cells, ..., and one n-cell. The chain complex is
$$0\to \Z^{\binom{n}{n}} \to  \Z^{\binom{n}{n-1}} \to \cdots \to  \Z^{\binom{n}{1}} \to  \Z^{\binom{n}{0}} \to 0$$
and all the boundary maps are zero. This can be understood by explicitly constructing the cases for $n = 0, 1, 2, 3$, then see the pattern.

Thus, $H_k((S^1)^n) \simeq \Z^{\binom{n}{k}}$ .

=== Complex projective space ===
If $X$ has no adjacent-dimensional cells, (so if it has n-cells, it has no (n-1)-cells and (n+1)-cells), then $H_n^{CW}(X)$ is the free abelian group generated by its n-cells, for each $n$.

The complex projective space $\mathbb CP^n$ is obtained by gluing together a 0-cell, a 2-cell, ..., and a (2n)-cell, thus $H_k(\mathbb CP^n) = \Z$ for $k = 0, 2, ..., 2n$, and zero otherwise.

=== Real projective space ===
The real projective space $\mathbb{R} P^n$ admits a CW-structure with one $k$-cell $e_k$ for all $k \in \{0, 1, \dots, n\}$. The attaching map for these $k$-cells is given by the 2-fold covering map $\varphi_k \colon S^{k - 1} \to \mathbb{R} P^{k - 1}$. (Observe that the $k$-skeleton $\mathbb{R} P^n_k \cong \mathbb{R} P^k$ for all $k \in \{0, 1, \dots, n\}$.) Note that in this case, $H_k(\mathbb{R} P^n_k, \mathbb{R} P^n_{k - 1}) \cong \mathbb{Z}$ for all $k \in \{0, 1, \dots, n\}$.

To compute the boundary map

$$\partial_k \colon H_k(\mathbb{R} P^n_k, \mathbb{R} P^n_{k - 1}) \to H_{k - 1}(\mathbb{R} P^n_{k - 1}, \mathbb{R} P^n_{k - 2}),$$

we must find the degree of the map

$$\chi_k
\colon
S^{k - 1}
\overset{\varphi_k}{\longrightarrow}
\mathbb{R} P^{k - 1}
\overset{q_k}{\longrightarrow}
\mathbb{R} P^{k - 1}/\mathbb{R} P^{k - 2}
\cong
S^{k - 1}.$$

Now, note that $\varphi_k^{-1}(\mathbb{R} P^{k - 2}) = S^{k - 2} \subseteq S^{k - 1}$, and for each point $x \in \mathbb{R} P^{k - 1} \setminus \mathbb{R} P^{k - 2}$, we have that $\varphi^{-1}(\{x\})$ consists of two points, one in each connected component (open hemisphere) of $S^{k - 1}\setminus S^{k - 2}$. Thus, in order to find the degree of the map $\chi_k$, it is sufficient to find the local degrees of $\chi_k$ on each of these open hemispheres. For ease of notation, we let $B_k$ and $\tilde B_k$ denote the connected components of $S^{k - 1}\setminus S^{k - 2}$. Then $\chi_k|_{B_k}$ and $\chi_k|_{\tilde B_k}$ are homeomorphisms, and $\chi_k|_{\tilde B_k} = \chi_k|_{B_k} \circ A$, where $A$ is the antipodal map. Now, the degree of the antipodal map on $S^{k - 1}$ is $(-1)^k$. Hence, without loss of generality, we have that the local degree of $\chi_k$ on $B_k$ is $1$ and the local degree of $\chi_k$ on $\tilde B_k$ is $(-1)^k$. Adding the local degrees, we have that

$$\deg(\chi_k)
=
1 + (-1)^k
=
\begin{cases}
2 & \text{if } k \text{ is even,}
\\
0 & \text{if } k \text{ is odd.}
\end{cases}$$

The boundary map $\partial_k$ is then given by $\deg(\chi_k)$.

We thus have that the CW-structure on $\mathbb{R} P^n$ gives rise to the following chain complex:

$$0
\longrightarrow
\mathbb{Z}
\overset{\partial_n}{\longrightarrow}
\cdots
\overset{2}{\longrightarrow}
\mathbb{Z}
\overset{0}{\longrightarrow}
\mathbb{Z}
\overset{2}{\longrightarrow}
\mathbb{Z}
\overset{0}{\longrightarrow}
\mathbb{Z}
\longrightarrow
0,$$

where $\partial_n = 2$ if $n$ is even and $\partial_n = 0$ if $n$ is odd. Hence, the cellular homology groups for $\mathbb{R} P^n$ are the following:

$$H_k(\mathbb{R} P^n)
=
\begin{cases}
\mathbb{Z} & \text{if } k = 0  \text{ and } k=n \text{ odd},
\\
\mathbb{Z}/2\mathbb{Z} & \text{if } 0 < k < n \text{ odd,}
\\
0 & \text{otherwise.}
\end{cases}$$

== Functoriality ==
Cellular homology is a functor from the category of CW complexes with cellular maps to the category of abelian groups. A cellular map $f:X\to Y$ gives a map of pairs $f:(X_n,X_{n-1})\to(Y_n,Y_{n-1})$ for all $n$, and thus induces a map $f_*:H_n(X_n,X_{n-1})\to H_n(Y_n,Y_{n-1})$ between the cellular chain groups of $X$ and $Y$. That $f_*$ is a chain map follows from the naturality of the long exact sequence of a pair. Hence $f_*$ is a map between the cellular homology groups of $X$ and $Y$.

The formula presented below allows one to compute the chain map $f_*$ in terms of the degrees of certain maps, similarly to the formula above for the boundary map in the cellular chain complex. Let $e_n^\alpha$ be an $n$-cell of $X$ and $e_n^\beta$ be an $n$-cell of $Y$.

Consider the composition

$$f_\beta^\alpha:
S^n \,
\stackrel{\cong}{\longrightarrow} \,
D^n/S^{n-1} \,
\stackrel{\bar\Phi_n^\alpha}{\longrightarrow} \,
X_n/X_{n-1} \,
\stackrel{\bar{f}}{\longrightarrow} \,
Y_n/(Y_n\setminus e_n^\beta) \,
\stackrel{\cong}{\longrightarrow} \,
S^n,$$

where $\bar\Phi_n^\alpha$ is the quotient map obtained from the characteristic map of $e_n^\alpha$, and $\bar{f}$ is the quotient map induced by the composition $X_n \, \stackrel{f}{\longrightarrow} \, Y_n\to Y_n/(Y_n\setminus e_n^\beta)$. The last map comes from the characteristic map of $e_n^\beta$.

Then the chain map $f_*:H_n(X_n,X_{n-1})\to H_n(Y_n,Y_{n-1})$ is determined by the formula

$$f_*(e_n^\alpha)=\sum_\beta \deg(f_\beta^\alpha)e_n^\beta,$$

where the summation takes place over all $n$-cells of $Y$.

== Other properties ==
One sees from the cellular chain complex that the $n$-skeleton determines all lower-dimensional homology modules:

$${H_{k}}(X) \cong {H_{k}}(X_{n})$$

for $k < n$.

An important consequence of this cellular perspective is that if a CW-complex has no cells in consecutive dimensions, then all of its homology modules are free. For example, the complex projective space $\mathbb{CP}^{n}$ has a cell structure with one cell in each even dimension; it follows that for $0 \leq k \leq n$,

$${H_{2 k}}(\mathbb{CP}^{n};\mathbb{Z}) \cong \mathbb{Z}$$

and

$${H_{2 k + 1}}(\mathbb{CP}^{n};\mathbb{Z}) = 0.$$

== Generalization ==
The Atiyah–Hirzebruch spectral sequence is the analogous method of computing the (co)homology of a CW-complex, for an arbitrary extraordinary (co)homology theory.

== Euler characteristic ==
For a cellular complex $X$, let $X_{j}$ be its $j$-th skeleton, and $c_{j}$ be the number of $j$-cells, i.e., the rank of the free module ${H_{j}}(X_{j},X_{j - 1})$. The Euler characteristic of $X$ is then defined by

$$\chi(X) = \sum_{j = 0}^{n} (-1)^{j} c_{j}.$$

The Euler characteristic is a homotopy invariant. In fact, in terms of the Betti numbers of $X$,

$$\chi(X) = \sum_{j = 0}^{n} (-1)^{j} \operatorname{Rank}({H_{j}}(X)).$$

This can be justified as follows. Consider the long exact sequence of relative homology for the triple $(X_{n},X_{n - 1},\varnothing)$:

$$\cdots \to {H_{i}}(X_{n - 1},\varnothing) \to {H_{i}}(X_{n},\varnothing) \to {H_{i}}(X_{n},X_{n - 1}) \to \cdots.$$

Chasing exactness through the sequence gives

$$\sum_{i = 0}^{n} (-1)^{i} \operatorname{Rank}({H_{i}}(X_{n},\varnothing))
= \sum_{i = 0}^{n} (-1)^{i} \operatorname{Rank}({H_{i}}(X_{n},X_{n - 1})) +
\sum_{i = 0}^{n} (-1)^{i} \operatorname{Rank}({H_{i}}(X_{n - 1},\varnothing)).$$

The same calculation applies to the triples $(X_{n - 1},X_{n - 2},\varnothing)$, $(X_{n - 2},X_{n - 3},\varnothing)$, etc. By induction,

$$\sum_{i = 0}^{n} (-1)^{i} \; \operatorname{Rank}({H_{i}}(X_{n},\varnothing))
= \sum_{j = 0}^{n} \sum_{i = 0}^{j} (-1)^{i} \operatorname{Rank}({H_{i}}(X_{j},X_{j - 1}))
= \sum_{j = 0}^{n} (-1)^{j} c_{j}.$$
