= Approximate fibration =

Mathematical concept

In algebraic topology, a branch of mathematics, an approximate fibration is a sort of fibration such that the homotopy lifting property holds only approximately. The notion was introduced by Coram and Duvall in 1977.

A manifold approximate fibration is a proper approximate fibration between manifolds. Some authors believe that manifold approximate fibrations are the "correct bundle theory for topological manifolds and singular spaces".
