= Mapping space =

Concept in topology

In mathematics, especially in algebraic topology, the mapping space between two spaces is the space of all the (continuous) maps between them.

Viewing the set of all the maps as a space is useful because that allows for topological considerations. For example, a curve $h: I \to \operatorname{Map}(X, Y)$ in the mapping space is exactly a homotopy between the starting point and the end point.

From the category theory point of view, a mapping space provides the internal Hom (i.e., hom that is also an object) in the category of spaces.

== Topologies ==
A mapping space can be equipped with several topologies. A common one is the compact-open topology or the k-ification of it. Typically, there is then the adjoint relation

$$\operatorname{Map}(X \times Y, Z) \simeq \operatorname{Map}(X, \operatorname{Map}(Y, Z))$$

and thus $\operatorname{Map}$ is an analog of the Hom functor. (For pathological spaces, this relation may fail.)

Here is another common one. We have:

$$\operatorname{Map}(X, Y) \hookrightarrow X \times Y$$

given by $f \mapsto \Gamma_f =$ the graph of $f$. Then we can give $\operatorname{Map}(X, Y)$ the Whitney topology (also called the fine topology or the strong topology) where a basic open set consists of those $g$ such that $\Gamma_g \subset U$ for some open subset $U \subset X \times Y$. The compact-open topology does not handle a behavior at infinity well and so sometimes the Whitney topology is used instead.

If $X$ is a paracompact and $Y$ is a metric space, then the Whitney topology has a basic open set of the form

$$B(f, \epsilon) := \{ g \mid d(g(x), f(x)) < \epsilon(x) \}$$

for some $f \in \operatorname{Map}(X, Y)$ and some continuous function $\epsilon : X \to \mathbb{R}_{> 0}$. If, moreover, $Y$ is complete, then we have the following important fact:

Let $Q \subset \operatorname{Map}(X, Y)$ be a subset such that every uniform limit of a sequence in $Q$, if any, is in $Q$. Then $Q$ is a Baire space.

This is proved by the same way Baire's category theorem is proved except we use the above family-version of a ball.

== Smooth mappings ==
For manifolds $M, N$, there is the subset $\mathcal{C}^r(M, N) \subset \operatorname{Map}(M, N)$ that consists of all the $\mathcal{C}^r$-smooth maps from $M$ to $N$. It can be equipped with the weak or strong topology.

A basic approximation theorem says that $\mathcal{C}_W^s(M, N)$ is dense in $\mathcal{C}_S^r(M, N)$ for $1 \le s \le \infty, 0 \le r < s$.

See also: Grauert's approximation theorem

== Homotopy type of a mapping space ==
A basic result here is a theorem of Milnor which says that the mapping space $\operatorname{Map}(X, Y)$ has the homotopy type of a CW-complex if $X$ is a compact Hausdorff space and $Y$ has the homotopy type of a CW-complex.
