= Topological monoid =

Concept in mathematics

In topology, a branch of mathematics, a topological monoid is a monoid object in the category of topological spaces. In other words, it is a monoid with a topology with respect to which the monoid's binary operation is continuous. Every topological group is a topological monoid.

== See also ==
- H-space
