= Weak equivalence (homotopy theory) =

In mathematics, a weak equivalence is a notion from homotopy theory that in some sense identifies objects that have the same "shape". This notion is formalized in the axiomatic definition of a model category.

A model category is a category with classes of morphisms called weak equivalences, fibrations, and cofibrations, satisfying several axioms. The associated homotopy category of a model category has the same objects, but the morphisms are changed in order to make the weak equivalences into isomorphisms. It is a useful observation that the associated homotopy category depends only on the weak equivalences, not on the fibrations and cofibrations.

== Topological spaces ==
Model categories were defined by Quillen as an axiomatization of homotopy theory that applies to topological spaces, but also to many other categories in algebra and geometry. The example that started the subject is the category of topological spaces with Serre fibrations as fibrations and weak homotopy equivalences as weak equivalences (the cofibrations for this model structure can be described as the retracts of relative cell complexes X ⊆ Y). By definition, a continuous mapping f: X → Y of spaces is called a weak homotopy equivalence if the induced function on sets of path components

$$f_*\colon \pi_0(X) \to \pi_0(Y)$$

is bijective, and for every point x in X and every n ≥ 1, the induced homomorphism

$$f_*\colon \pi_n(X,x) \to \pi_n(Y,f(x))$$

on homotopy groups is bijective. (For X and Y path-connected, the first condition is automatic, and it suffices to state the second condition for a single point x in X.)

Whitehead theorem implies that weak homotopy equivalence between CW-complexes actually is a homotopy equivalence. For simply connected topological spaces X and Y, a map f: X → Y is a weak homotopy equivalence if and only if the induced homomorphism f_{*}: H_{n}(X,Z) → H_{n}(Y,Z) on singular homology groups is bijective for all n. Likewise, for simply connected spaces X and Y, a map f: X → Y is a weak homotopy equivalence if and only if the pullback homomorphism f*: H^{n}(Y,Z) → H^{n}(X,Z) on singular cohomology is bijective for all n.

Example: Let X be the set of natural numbers {0, 1, 2, ...} and let Y be the set {0} ∪ {1, 1/2, 1/3, ...}, both with the subspace topology from the real line. Define f: X → Y by mapping 0 to 0 and n to 1/n for positive integers n. Then f is continuous, and in fact a weak homotopy equivalence, but it is not a homotopy equivalence.

The homotopy category of topological spaces (obtained by inverting the weak homotopy equivalences) greatly simplifies the category of topological spaces. Indeed, this homotopy category is equivalent to the category of CW complexes with morphisms being homotopy classes of continuous maps.

Many other model structures on the category of topological spaces have also been considered. For example, in the Strøm model structure on topological spaces, the fibrations are the Hurewicz fibrations and the weak equivalences are the homotopy equivalences.

== Chain complexes ==
Some other important model categories involve chain complexes. Let A be a Grothendieck abelian category, for example the category of modules over a ring or the category of sheaves of abelian groups on a topological space. Define a category C(A) with objects the complexes X of objects in A,

$$\cdots\to X_1\to X_0\to X_{-1}\to\cdots,$$

and morphisms the chain maps. (It is equivalent to consider "cochain complexes" of objects of A, where the numbering is written as

$$\cdots\to X^{-1}\to X^0\to X^1\to\cdots,$$

simply by defining X^{i} = X_{−i}.)

The category C(A) has a model structure in which the cofibrations are the monomorphisms and the weak equivalences are the quasi-isomorphisms. By definition, a chain map f: X → Y is a quasi-isomorphism if the induced homomorphism

$$f_*\colon H_n(X) \to H_n(Y)$$

on homology is an isomorphism for all integers n. (Here H_{n}(X) is the object of A defined as the kernel of X_{n} → X_{n−1} modulo the image of X_{n+1} → X_{n}.) The resulting homotopy category is called the derived category D(A).

== Trivial fibrations and trivial cofibrations ==
In any model category, a fibration that is also a weak equivalence is called a trivial (or acyclic) fibration. A cofibration that is also a weak equivalence is called a trivial (or acyclic) cofibration.
