= Retraction (topology) =

Continuous, position-preserving mapping from a topological space into a subspace

In topology, a retraction is a continuous mapping from a topological space into a subspace that preserves the position of all points in that subspace. The subspace is then called a retract of the original space. A deformation retraction is a mapping that captures the idea of continuously shrinking a space into a subspace.

An absolute neighborhood retract (ANR) is a particularly well-behaved type of topological space. For example, every topological manifold is an ANR. Every ANR has the homotopy type of a very simple topological space, a CW complex.

== Definitions ==
=== Retract ===
Let X be a topological space and A a subspace of X. Then a continuous map

$$r\colon X \to A$$

is a retraction if the restriction of r to A is the identity map on A; that is, $r(a) = a$ for all a in A. Equivalently, denoting by

$$\iota\colon A \hookrightarrow X$$

the inclusion, a retraction is a continuous map r such that

$$r \circ \iota = \operatorname{id}_A,$$

that is, the composition of r with the inclusion is the identity of A. Note that, by definition, a retraction maps X onto A. A subspace A is called a retract of X if such a retraction exists. For instance, any non-empty space retracts to a point in the obvious way (any constant map yields a retraction). If X is Hausdorff, then A must be a closed subset of X.

If $r: X \to A$ is a retraction, then the composition $\iota \circ r$ is an idempotent continuous map from X to X. Conversely, given any idempotent continuous map $s: X \to X,$ we obtain a retraction onto the image of s by restricting the codomain.

=== Deformation retract and strong deformation retract ===
A continuous map

$$F\colon X \times [0, 1] \to X$$

is a deformation retraction of a space X onto a subspace A if, for every x in X and a in A,

$$F(x,0) = x, \quad F(x,1) \in A ,\quad \mbox{and} \quad F(a,1) = a.$$

In other words, a deformation retraction is a homotopy between a retraction (strictly, between its composition with the inclusion) and the identity map on X. The subspace A is called a deformation retract of X. A deformation retraction is a special case of a homotopy equivalence.

A retract need not be a deformation retract. For instance, having a single point as a deformation retract of a space X would imply that X is path connected (and in fact that X is contractible).

Note: An equivalent definition of deformation retraction is the following. A continuous map $r: X \to A$ is itself called a deformation retraction if it is a retraction and its composition with the inclusion is homotopic to the identity map on X. In this language, a deformation retraction still carries with it a homotopy between the identity map on X and itself, but we refer to the map $r$ rather than the homotopy as a deformation retraction.

If, in the definition of a deformation retraction, we add the requirement that

$$F(a,t) = a$$

for all t in [0, 1] and a in A, then F is called a strong deformation retraction. In other words, a strong deformation retraction leaves points in A fixed throughout the homotopy. (Some authors, such as Hatcher, take this as the definition of deformation retraction.)

As an example, the n-sphere $S^{n}$ is a strong deformation retract of $\reals^{n+1} \backslash \{0\};$ as strong deformation retraction one can choose the map

$$F(x,t)=(1-t)x+t{x\over \|x\|}.$$

Note that the condition of being a strong deformation retract is strictly stronger than being a deformation retract. For instance, let X be the closed infinite broom. It is the subspace of $\mathbb{R}^2$ consisting of closed line segments connecting the origin and the point $(1,1/n)$ for n a positive integer, together with the closed line segment connecting the origin with $(0,1)$. Let X have the subspace topology inherited from the Euclidean topology on $\mathbb{R}^2$. Now let A be the subspace of X consisting of the line segment connecting the origin with $(1,0)$. Then A is a deformation retract of X but not a strong deformation retract of X.

=== Cofibration and neighborhood deformation retract ===
A map f: A → X of topological spaces is a (Hurewicz) cofibration if it has the homotopy extension property for maps to any space. This is one of the central concepts of homotopy theory. A cofibration f is always injective, in fact a homeomorphism to its image. If X is Hausdorff (or a compactly generated weak Hausdorff space), then the image of a cofibration f is closed in X.

Among all closed inclusions, cofibrations can be characterized as follows. The inclusion of a closed subspace A in a space X is a cofibration if and only if A is a neighborhood deformation retract of X, meaning that there exists a continuous map $u: X \rightarrow [0, 1]$ with $A = u^{-1}\!\left(0\right)$ and a homotopy $H: X \times [0, 1] \rightarrow X$ such that $H(x,0) = x$ for all $x \in X,$ $H(a,t) = a$ for all $a \in A$ and $t \in [0, 1],$ and $H\left(x,1\right) \in A$ if $u(x) < 1$.

For example, the inclusion of a subcomplex in a CW complex is a cofibration.

== Properties ==
- One basic property of a retract A of X (with retraction $r: X \to A$) is that every continuous map $f: A \rightarrow Y$ has at least one extension $g: X \rightarrow Y,$ namely $g = f \circ r$.
- If a subspace is a retract of a space, then the inclusion induces an injection between fundamental groups.
- Deformation retraction is a particular case of homotopy equivalence. In fact, two spaces are homotopy equivalent if and only if they are both homeomorphic to deformation retracts of a single larger space.
- Any topological space that deformation retracts to a point is contractible and vice versa. However, there exist contractible spaces that do not strongly deformation retract to a point.

== No-retraction theorem ==
The boundary of the n-dimensional ball, that is, the (n−1)-sphere, is not a retract of the ball. (See Brouwer fixed-point theorem § A proof using homology or cohomology.)

== Absolute neighborhood retract (ANR) ==
A closed subset $X$ of a topological space $Y$ is called a neighborhood retract of $Y$ if $X$ is a retract of some open subset of $Y$ that contains $X$.

Let $\mathcal{C}$ be a class of topological spaces, closed under homeomorphisms and passage to closed subsets. Following Borsuk (starting in 1931), a space $X$ is called an absolute retract for the class $\mathcal{C}$, written $\operatorname{AR} \left(\mathcal{C}\right),$ if $X$ is in $\mathcal{C}$ and whenever $X$ is a closed subset of a space $Y$ in $\mathcal{C}$, $X$ is a retract of $Y$. A space $X$ is an absolute neighborhood retract for the class $\mathcal{C}$, written $\operatorname{ANR} \left(\mathcal{C}\right),$ if $X$ is in $\mathcal{C}$ and whenever $X$ is a closed subset of a space $Y$ in $\mathcal{C}$, $X$ is a neighborhood retract of $Y$.

Various classes $\mathcal{C}$ such as normal spaces have been considered in this definition, but the class $\mathcal{M}$ of metrizable spaces has been found to give the most satisfactory theory. For that reason, the notations AR and ANR by themselves are used in this article to mean $\operatorname {AR} \left({\mathcal {M}}\right)$ and $\operatorname {ANR} \left({\mathcal {M}}\right)$.

A metrizable space is an AR if and only if it is contractible and an ANR. By Dugundji, every locally convex metrizable topological vector space $V$ is an AR; more generally, every nonempty convex subset of such a vector space $V$ is an AR. For example, any normed vector space (complete or not) is an AR. More concretely, Euclidean space $\reals^{n},$ the unit cube $I^{n},$and the Hilbert cube $I^{\omega}$ are ARs.

ANRs form a remarkable class of "well-behaved" topological spaces. Among their properties are:

- Every open subset of an ANR is an ANR.
- By Hanner, a metrizable space that has an open cover by ANRs is an ANR. (That is, being an ANR is a local property for metrizable spaces.) It follows that every topological manifold is an ANR. For example, the sphere $S^{n}$ is an ANR but not an AR (because it is not contractible). In infinite dimensions, Hanner's theorem implies that every Hilbert cube manifold as well as the (rather different, for example not locally compact) Hilbert manifolds and Banach manifolds are ANRs.
- Every locally finite CW complex is an ANR. An arbitrary CW complex need not be metrizable, but every CW complex has the homotopy type of an ANR (which is metrizable, by definition).
- Every ANR X is locally contractible in the sense that for every open neighborhood $U$ of a point $x$ in $X$, there is an open neighborhood $V$ of $x$ contained in $U$ such that the inclusion $V \hookrightarrow U$ is homotopic to a constant map. A finite-dimensional metrizable space is an ANR if and only if it is locally contractible in this sense. For example, the Cantor set is a compact subset of the real line that is not an ANR, since it is not even locally connected.
- Counterexamples: Borsuk found a compact subset of $\reals^{3}$ that is an ANR but not strictly locally contractible. (A space is strictly locally contractible if every open neighborhood $U$ of each point $x$ contains a contractible open neighborhood of $x$.) Borsuk also found a compact subset of the Hilbert cube that is locally contractible (as defined above) but not an ANR.
- Every ANR has the homotopy type of a CW complex, by Whitehead and Milnor. Moreover, a locally compact ANR has the homotopy type of a locally finite CW complex; and, by West, a compact ANR has the homotopy type of a finite CW complex. In this sense, ANRs avoid all the homotopy-theoretic pathologies of arbitrary topological spaces. For example, the Whitehead theorem holds for ANRs: a map of ANRs that induces an isomorphism on homotopy groups (for all choices of base point) is a homotopy equivalence. Since ANRs include topological manifolds, Hilbert cube manifolds, Banach manifolds, and so on, these results apply to a large class of spaces.
- Many mapping spaces are ANRs. In particular, let Y be an ANR with a closed subspace A that is an ANR, and let X be any compact metrizable space with a closed subspace B. Then the space $\left(Y, A\right)^{\left(X, B\right)}$ of maps of pairs $\left(X, B\right) \rightarrow \left(Y, A\right)$ (with the compact-open topology on the mapping space) is an ANR. It follows, for example, that the loop space of any CW complex has the homotopy type of a CW complex.
- By Cauty, a metrizable space $X$ is an ANR if and only if every open subset of $X$ has the homotopy type of a CW complex.
- By Cauty, there is a metric linear space $V$ (meaning a topological vector space with a translation-invariant metric) that is not an AR. One can take $V$ to be separable and an F-space (that is, a complete metric linear space). (By Dugundji's theorem above, $V$ cannot be locally convex.) Since $V$ is contractible and not an AR, it is also not an ANR. By Cauty's theorem above, $V$ has an open subset $U$ that is not homotopy equivalent to a CW complex. Thus there is a metrizable space $U$ that is strictly locally contractible but is not homotopy equivalent to a CW complex. It is not known whether a compact (or locally compact) metrizable space that is strictly locally contractible must be an ANR.

== See also ==
- Euclidean neighborhood retract
