= Fibration =

Concept in algebraic topology

The notion of a fibration generalizes the notion of a fiber bundle and plays an important role in algebraic topology, a branch of mathematics.

Fibrations are used, for example, in Postnikov systems or obstruction theory.

In this article, all mappings are continuous mappings between topological spaces.

== Formal definitions ==
=== Homotopy lifting property ===
A mapping $p \colon E \to B$ satisfies the homotopy lifting property for a space $X$ if:

- for every homotopy $h \colon X \times [0, 1] \to B$ and
- for every mapping (also called lift) $\tilde h_0 \colon X \to E$ lifting $h|_{X \times 0} = h_0$ (i.e. $h_0 = p \circ \tilde h_0$)

there exists a (not necessarily unique) homotopy $\tilde h \colon X \times [0, 1] \to E$ lifting $h$ (i.e. $h = p \circ \tilde h$) with $\tilde h_0 = \tilde h|_{X \times 0}.$

The following commutative diagram shows the situation:

=== Fibration ===
A fibration (also called Hurewicz fibration) is a mapping $p \colon E \to B$ satisfying the homotopy lifting property for all spaces $X.$ The space $B$ is called the base space and the space $E$ is called the total space. The fiber over $b \in B$ is the subspace $F_b = p^{-1}(b) \subseteq E.$

=== Serre fibration ===
A Serre fibration (also called weak fibration) is a mapping $p \colon E \to B$ satisfying the homotopy lifting property for all CW-complexes.

Every Hurewicz fibration is a Serre fibration.

=== Quasifibration ===
A mapping $p \colon E \to B$ is called quasifibration, if for every $b \in B,$ $e \in p^{-1}(b)$ and $i \geq 0$ holds that the induced mapping $p_* \colon \pi_i(E, p^{-1}(b), e) \to \pi_i(B, b)$ is an isomorphism.

Every Serre fibration is a quasifibration.

== Examples ==
- The projection onto the first factor $p \colon B \times F \to B$ is a fibration. That is, trivial bundles are fibrations.
- Every covering $p \colon E \to B$ is a fibration. Specifically, for every homotopy $h \colon X \times [0, 1] \to B$ and every lift $\tilde h_0 \colon X \to E$ there exists a uniquely defined lift $\tilde h \colon X \times [0,1] \to E$ with $p \circ \tilde h = h.$
- Every fiber bundle $p \colon E \to B$ satisfies the homotopy lifting property for every CW-complex.
- A fiber bundle with a paracompact and Hausdorff base space satisfies the homotopy lifting property for all spaces.
- An example of a fibration which is not a fiber bundle is given by the mapping $i^* \colon X^{I^k} \to X^{\partial I^k}$ induced by the inclusion $i \colon \partial I^k \to I^k$ where $k \in \N,$ $X$ a topological space and $X^{A} = \{f \colon A \to X\}$ is the space of all continuous mappings with the compact-open topology.
- The Hopf fibration $S^1 \to S^3 \to S^2$ is a non-trivial fiber bundle and, specifically, a Serre fibration.

== Basic concepts ==
=== Fiber homotopy equivalence ===
A mapping $f \colon E_1 \to E_2$ between total spaces of two fibrations $p_1 \colon E_1 \to B$ and $p_2 \colon E_2 \to B$ with the same base space is a fibration homomorphism if the following diagram commutes:

The mapping $f$ is a fiber homotopy equivalence if in addition a fibration homomorphism $g \colon E_2 \to E_1$ exists, such that the mappings $f \circ g$ and $g \circ f$ are homotopic, by fibration homomorphisms, to the identities $\operatorname{Id}_{E_2}$ and $\operatorname{Id}_{E_1}.$

=== Pullback fibration ===
Given a fibration $p \colon E \to B$ and a mapping $f \colon A \to B$, the mapping $p_f \colon f^*(E) \to A$ is a fibration, where $f^*(E) = \{(a, e) \in A \times E\ |\ f(a) = p(e)\}$ is the pullback and the projections of $f^*(E)$ onto $A$ and $E$ yield the following commutative diagram:

The fibration $p_f$ is called the pullback fibration or induced fibration.

=== Pathspace fibration ===
With the pathspace construction, any continuous mapping can be extended to a fibration by enlarging its domain to a homotopy equivalent space. This fibration is called pathspace fibration.

The total space $E_f$ of the pathspace fibration for a continuous mapping $f \colon A \to B$ between topological spaces consists of pairs $(a, \gamma)$ with $a \in A$ and paths $\gamma \colon I \to B$ with starting point $\gamma (0) = f(a),$ where $I = [0, 1]$ is the unit interval. The space $E_f = \{ (a, \gamma) \in A \times B^I | \gamma (0) = f(a) \}$ carries the subspace topology of $A \times B^I,$ where $B^I$ describes the space of all mappings $I \to B$ and carries the compact-open topology.

The pathspace fibration is given by the mapping $p \colon E_f \to B$ with $p(a, \gamma) = \gamma (1).$ The fiber $F_f$ is also called the homotopy fiber of $f$ and consists of the pairs $(a, \gamma)$ with $a \in A$ and paths $\gamma \colon [0, 1] \to B,$ where $\gamma(0) = f(a)$ and $\gamma(1) = b_0 \in B$ holds.

For the special case of the inclusion of the base point $i \colon b_0 \to B$, an important example of the pathspace fibration emerges. The total space $E_i$ consists of all paths in $B$ which starts at $b_0.$ This space is denoted by $PB$ and is called path space. The pathspace fibration $p \colon PB \to B$ maps each path to its endpoint, hence the fiber $p^{-1}(b_0)$ consists of all closed paths. The fiber is denoted by $\Omega B$ and is called loop space.

== Properties ==
- The fibers $p^{-1}(b)$ over $b \in B$ are homotopy equivalent for each path component of $B.$
- For a homotopy $f \colon [0, 1] \times A \to B$ the pullback fibrations $f^*_0(E) \to A$ and $f^*_1(E) \to A$ are fiber homotopy equivalent.
- If the base space $B$ is contractible, then the fibration $p \colon E \to B$ is fiber homotopy equivalent to the product fibration $B \times F \to B.$
- The pathspace fibration of a fibration $p \colon E \to B$ is very similar to itself. More precisely, the inclusion $E \hookrightarrow E_p$ is a fiber homotopy equivalence.
- For a fibration $p \colon E \to B$ with fiber $F$ and contractible total space, there is a weak homotopy equivalence $F \to \Omega B.$

== Puppe sequence ==
For a fibration $p \colon E \to B$ with fiber $F$ and base point $b_0 \in B$ the inclusion $F \hookrightarrow F_p$ of the fiber into the homotopy fiber is a homotopy equivalence. The mapping $i \colon F_p \to E$ with $i (e, \gamma) = e$, where $e \in E$ and $\gamma \colon I \to B$ is a path from $p(e)$ to $b_0$ in the base space, is a fibration. Specifically it is the pullback fibration of the pathspace fibration $PB \to B$ along $p$. This procedure can now be applied again to the fibration $i$ and so on. This leads to a long sequence:

$\cdots \to F_j \to F_i \xrightarrow {j} F_p \xrightarrow i E \xrightarrow p B.$

The fiber of $i$ over a point $e_0 \in p^{-1}(b_0)$ consists of the pairs $(e_0, \gamma)$ where $\gamma$ is a path from $p(e_0) = b_0$ to $b_0$, i.e. the loop space $\Omega B$. The inclusion $\Omega B \hookrightarrow F_i$ of the fiber of $i$ into the homotopy fiber of $i$ is again a homotopy equivalence and iteration yields the sequence:

$\cdots \Omega^2B \to \Omega F \to \Omega E \to \Omega B \to F \to E \to B.$

Due to the duality of fibration and cofibration, there also exists a sequence of cofibrations. These two sequences are known as the Puppe sequences or the sequences of fibrations and cofibrations.

== Principal fibration ==
A fibration $p \colon E \to B$ with fiber $F$ is called principal, if there exists a commutative diagram:

The bottom row is a sequence of fibrations and the vertical mappings are weak homotopy equivalences. Principal fibrations play an important role in Postnikov towers.

== Long exact sequence of homotopy groups ==
For a Serre fibration $p \colon E \to B$ there exists a long exact sequence of homotopy groups. For base points $b_0 \in B$ and $x_0 \in F = p^{-1}(b_0)$ this is given by:

$\cdots \rightarrow \pi_n(F,x_0) \rightarrow \pi_n(E, x_0) \rightarrow \pi_n(B, b_0) \rightarrow \pi_{n - 1}(F, x_0) \rightarrow$ $\cdots \rightarrow \pi_0(F, x_0) \rightarrow \pi_0(E, x_0).$

The homomorphisms $\pi_n(F, x_0) \rightarrow \pi_n(E, x_0)$ and $\pi_n(E, x_0) \rightarrow \pi_n(B, b_0)$ are the induced homomorphisms of the inclusion $i \colon F \hookrightarrow E$ and the projection $p \colon E \rightarrow B.$

=== Hopf fibration ===
Hopf fibrations are a family of fiber bundles whose fiber, total space and base space are spheres:

$S^0 \hookrightarrow S^1 \rightarrow S^1,$

$S^1 \hookrightarrow S^3 \rightarrow S^2,$

$S^3 \hookrightarrow S^7 \rightarrow S^4,$

$S^7 \hookrightarrow S^{15} \rightarrow S^8.$

The long exact sequence of homotopy groups of the Hopf fibration $S^1 \hookrightarrow S^3 \rightarrow S^2$ yields:

$\cdots \rightarrow \pi_n(S^1,x_0) \rightarrow \pi_n(S^3, x_0) \rightarrow \pi_n(S^2, b_0) \rightarrow \pi_{n - 1}(S^1, x_0) \rightarrow$ $\cdots \rightarrow \pi_1(S^1, x_0) \rightarrow \pi_1(S^3, x_0) \rightarrow \pi_1(S^2, b_0).$

This sequence splits into short exact sequences, as the fiber $S^1$ in $S^3$ is contractible to a point:

$0 \rightarrow \pi_i(S^3) \rightarrow \pi_i(S^2) \rightarrow \pi_{i-1}(S^1) \rightarrow 0.$

This short exact sequence splits because of the suspension homomorphism $\phi \colon \pi_{i - 1}(S^1) \to \pi_i(S^2)$ and there are isomorphisms:

$\pi_i(S^2) \cong \pi_i(S^3) \oplus \pi_{i - 1}(S^1).$

The homotopy groups $\pi_{i - 1}(S^1)$ are trivial for $i \geq 3,$ so there exist isomorphisms between $\pi_i(S^2)$ and $\pi_i(S^3)$ for $i \geq 3.$

Analogously, the fibers $S^3$ in $S^7$ and $S^7$ in $S^{15}$ are contractible to a point. Further the short exact sequences split and there are families of isomorphisms:

$\pi_i(S^4) \cong \pi_i(S^7) \oplus \pi_{i - 1}(S^3)$ and $\pi_i(S^8) \cong \pi_i(S^{15}) \oplus \pi_{i - 1}(S^7).$

== Spectral sequence ==
Spectral sequences are important tools in algebraic topology for computing (co-)homology groups.

The Leray-Serre spectral sequence connects the (co-)homology of the total space and the fiber with the (co-)homology of the base space of a fibration. For a fibration $p \colon E \to B$ with fiber $F,$ where the base space is a path connected CW-complex, and an additive homology theory $G_*$ there exists a spectral sequence:

$$H_k (B; G_q(F)) \cong E^2_{k, q} \implies G_{k + q}(E).$$

Fibrations do not yield long exact sequences in homology, as they do in homotopy. But under certain conditions, fibrations provide exact sequences in homology. For a fibration $p \colon E \to B$ with fiber $F,$ where base space and fiber are path connected, the fundamental group $\pi_1(B)$ acts trivially on $H_*(F)$ and in addition the conditions $H_p(B) = 0$ for $0<p<m$ and $H_q(F) = 0$ for $0<q<n$ hold, an exact sequence exists (also known under the name Serre exact sequence):

$H_{m+n-1}(F) \xrightarrow {i_*} H_{m+n-1}(E) \xrightarrow {f_*} H_{m+n-1} (B) \xrightarrow \tau H_{m+n-2} (F) \xrightarrow {i^*} \cdots \xrightarrow {f_*} H_1 (B) \to 0.$

This sequence can be used, for example, to prove Hurewicz's theorem or to compute the homology of loopspaces of the form $\Omega S^n:$

$$H_k (\Omega S^n) = \begin{cases} \Z & \exist q \in \Z \colon k = q (n-1)\\
0 & \text{otherwise} \end{cases}.$$

For the special case of a fibration $p \colon E \to S^n$ where the base space is a $n$-sphere with fiber $F,$ there exist exact sequences (also called Wang sequences) for homology and cohomology:

$\cdots \to H_q(F) \xrightarrow{i_*} H_q(E) \to H_{q-n}(F) \to H_{q-1}(F) \to \cdots$ $\cdots \to H^q(E) \xrightarrow{i^*} H^q(F) \to H^{q-n+1}(F) \to H^{q+1}(E) \to \cdots$

== Orientability ==
For a fibration $p \colon E \to B$ with fiber $F$ and a fixed commutative ring $R$ with a unit, there exists a contravariant functor from the fundamental groupoid of $B$ to the category of graded $R$-modules, which assigns to $b \in B$ the module $H_*(F_b, R)$ and to the path class $[\omega]$ the homomorphism $h[\omega]_* \colon H_*(F_{\omega (0)}, R) \to H_*(F_{\omega (1)}, R),$ where $h[\omega]$ is a homotopy class in $[F_{\omega(0)}, F_{\omega (1)}].$

A fibration is called orientable over $R$ if for any closed path $\omega$ in $B$ the following holds: $h[\omega]_* = 1.$

== Euler characteristic ==
For an orientable fibration $p \colon E \to B$ over the field $\mathbb{K}$ with fiber $F$ and path connected base space, the Euler characteristic of the total space is given by:

$\chi(E) = \chi(B)\chi(F).$

Here the Euler characteristics of the base space and the fiber are defined over the field $\mathbb{K}$.

== See also ==
- Approximate fibration
- Cofibration
