= Greenblatt =

Greenblatt or Greenblat (Yiddish: "green leaf") is a surname. Notable people with the surname include:

- Ryan greenblatt, American AI scientist
- A. T. Greenblatt, American mechanical engineer and author
- Aliza Greenblatt (1888–1975), American Yiddish poet
- Ariana Greenblatt (born 2007), American actress
- C. H. Greenblatt (born 1972), American writer and storyboard artist
- David Greenblatt (1938–2009), Canadian race car driver
- Ephraim Greenblatt (1932–2014), American rabbi
- Evelyn Greenblatt Howren (1917–1998), American woman aviator and WASP
- Jack Greenblatt, Canadian scientist
- James Marshall (born 1967 as James David Greenblatt), American actor
- Jason Greenblatt (born 1967), American lawyer, United States Special Representative for International Negotiations
- Joel Greenblatt (born 1957), American financier
- Jonathan Greenblatt (born 1970), American entrepreneur and corporate executive
- Mark Greenblatt, American attorney and government official
- Martha Greenblatt (born 1941), Hungarian-American chemist
- Nota Greenblatt (1925–2022), American rabbi
- Richard Greenblatt (born 1944), American computer programmer
- Richard Greenblatt (born 1953), Canadian actor/playwright
- Robert Greenblatt (born 1959/1960), American television executive and chairman of NBC Entertainment
- Robert Greenblatt (anti war activist) (1938–2009), American professor
- Robert Benjamin Greenblatt (1906–1987), Canadian physician and medical researcher
- Rodney Alan Greenblat (born 1960), American graphic artist
- Sam Greenblatt, American businessman
- Shon Greenblatt, American actor
- Stephen Greenblatt (born 1943), American new historicist literary critic and theorist
