= Eckmann–Hilton duality =

Theory in algebraic topology

In the mathematical disciplines of algebraic topology and homotopy theory, Eckmann–Hilton duality in its most basic form, consists of taking a given diagram for a particular concept and reversing the direction of all arrows, much as in category theory with the idea of the opposite category. A significantly deeper form argues that the fact that the dual notion of a limit is a colimit allows us to change the Eilenberg–Steenrod axioms for homology to give axioms for cohomology. It is named after Beno Eckmann and Peter Hilton.

== Discussion ==
An example is given by currying, which tells us that for any object $X$, a map $X \times I \to Y$ is the same as a map $X \to Y^I$, where $Y^I$ is the exponential object, given by all maps from $I$ to $Y$. In the case of topological spaces, if we take $I$ to be the unit interval, this leads to a duality between $X \times I$ and $Y^I$, which then gives a duality between the reduced suspension $\Sigma X$, which is a quotient of $X \times I$, and the loop space $\Omega Y$, which is a subspace of $Y^I$. This then leads to the adjoint relation $\langle \Sigma X, Y \rangle = \langle X, \Omega Y \rangle$, which allows the study of spectra, which give rise to cohomology theories.

We can also directly relate fibrations and cofibrations: a fibration $p \colon E \to B$ is defined by having the homotopy lifting property, represented by the following diagram

and a cofibration $i \colon A \to X$ is defined by having the dual homotopy extension property, represented by dualising the previous diagram:

The above considerations also apply when looking at the sequences associated to a fibration or a cofibration, as given a fibration $F \to E \to B$ we get the sequence

$$\cdots \to \Omega^2 B \to \Omega F \to \Omega E \to \Omega B \to F \to E \to B \,$$

and given a cofibration $A \to X \to X/A$ we get the sequence

$$A \to X \to X/A \to \Sigma A \to \Sigma X \to \Sigma \left (X/A \right ) \to \Sigma^2 A \to \cdots. \,$$

and more generally, the duality between the exact and coexact Puppe sequences.

This also allows us to relate homotopy and cohomology: we know that homotopy groups are homotopy classes of maps from the n-sphere to our space, written $\pi_n(X,p) \cong \langle S^n,X \rangle$, and we know that the sphere has a single nonzero (reduced) cohomology group. On the other hand, cohomology groups are homotopy classes of maps to spaces with a single nonzero homotopy group. This is given by the Eilenberg–MacLane spaces $K(G,n)$ and the relation

$$H^n(X;G) \cong \langle X,K(G,n) \rangle.$$

A formalization of the above informal relationships is given by Fuks duality.

== See also ==
- Model category
- Tensor-hom adjunction
