= Georg Joseph Sidler =

Swiss mathematician

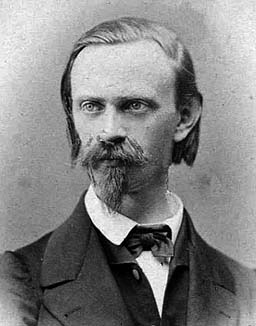
- Born: 31 August 1831; Zug, Switzerland
- Died: 9 November 1907 (aged 76); Bern, Switzerland
- Education: University of Zurich
- Scientific career
- Fields: Mathematics; Astronomy
- Workplaces: University of Bern
- Thesis: Sur les inégalités du moyen mouvement d'Uranus dues a l'action perturbatrice de Neptune (1855)
- Doctoral advisor: Inspired by Victor Puiseux

Georg Joseph Sidler (31 August 1831 – 9 November 1907) was a Swiss mathematician, professor at the university of Bern.

== Life and work ==
Sidler was born on 31 August 1831 in Zug, Switzerland to Georg Joseph Sidler (1782 - 1861) and Verena Maria Sidler (née Moos) (1806 - 1886). He was their only son. He also had two half-sisters from his father's first marriage. One of the girls died at the age of seven. Both of Georg's parents came from old-established families in Canton of Zug; Many of his ancestors had been involved in local and cantonal politics. His paternal grandfather, Georg Damian held a number of offices; most notably he served as a Landvogt (bailiff) in the Valle Maggia in Ticino. Sidler's father became a politician himself, first in his home, Canton of Zug, then in Zürich and in the newly established federal government. From 1810-1833, he served as delegate of Canton of Zug in the Tagsatzung. Georg Joseph was a liberal politician, but as the conservatives gained power in Zug his influence dwindled, and as a result the family moved to Unterstrass, near Zürich, in 1839. Georg Joseph also had a great interest in astronomy and mathematics, having attended lectures in both subjects during his law studies. In his house, both in Zug and in Unterstrass, he had a little observatory, and Graf reports in that 'he always took Kästner's Foundations of Mathematics or Lacroix's Introduction to Differential and Integral Calculus along to meetings of the National Court'. Georg Joseph did not publish any scientific papers, but he might have played a role in sparking his son's interest in mathematics and astronomy. Sidler attended primary school first in Zug and then in Unterstrass. He attended the Gymnasium in Zürich from 1843-1850. There, he continued to excel in mathematics and ancient languages. After having obtained his Matura, he matriculated at the University of Zürich to study mathematics. Sidler was awarded with a doctorate at the University of Zurich in 1854. His doctoral dissertation, Sur les inégalités du moyen mouvement d'Uranus dues à l'action perturbatrice de Neptun ("On the inequalities of the mean motion of Uranus due to the disturbing action of Neptune"), was inspired by mathematician and astronomer, Victor Puiseux. The following years he completed studies at the Universities of Zurich and Berlin. In 1857, he was appointed Assistant Professor of University of Bern and in 1880, he became full professor. He retired in 1898.

His most important works were about spherical harmonic functions and on perturbation theory. In 1861 he published his main book in Bern: Die Theorie der Kugelfunktionen.

Although described as lank and bookish, Sidler enjoyed good health throughout his lifetime. On 9 November 1907, Sidler died from a heart attack, and was buried in Zürich three days later.

== Bibliography ==
- Hentschel, Ann M. (2005). "Peripatetic Highlights in Bern". Physics in Perspective. 7 (1): 107–129. Bibcode:2005PhP.....7..107H. doi:10.1007/s00016-004-0232-0. ISSN 1422-6944. S2CID 121542767.
- Frei, Günther; Stammbach, Urs (1994). Die Mathematiker an den Zürcher Hochschulen (in German). Springer. ISBN 978-3-7643-5078-9.
