= Puncture (topology) =

Removal of points from a manifold

In topology, puncturing a manifold is removing a finite set of points from that manifold. The set of points can be small as a single point. In this case, the manifold is known as once-punctured. With the removal of a second point, it becomes twice-punctured, and so on.

Examples of punctured manifolds include the open disk (which is a sphere with a single puncture), the cylinder (which is a sphere with two punctures), and the Möbius strip (which is a projective plane with a single puncture).

The set of non-zero complex numbers is the complex plane once punctured at the origin, sometimes denoted $\Complex^*$.

== Bibliography ==
- Seifert, Herbert; Threlfall, William (1980). A Textbook of Topology. Pure and Applied Mathematics. Vol. 89. Translated by Goldman, Michael A. New York & London: Academic Press. p. 12. ISBN 0-12-634850-2. MR 0575168.
