= Join (topology) =

Operation in topology

Geometric join of two line segments. The original spaces are shown in green and blue. The join is a three-dimensional solid, a disphenoid, in gray.

In topology, a field of mathematics, the join of two topological spaces $A$ and $B$, often denoted by $A\ast B$ or $A\star B$, is a topological space formed by taking the disjoint union of the two spaces, and attaching line segments joining every point in $A$ to every point in $B$. The join of a space $A$ with itself is denoted by $A^{\star 2} := A\star A$. The join is defined in slightly different ways in different contexts.

== Geometric sets ==
If $A$ and $B$ are subsets of the Euclidean space $\mathbb{R}^n$, then:

$A\star B\ :=\ \{ t\cdot a + (1-t)\cdot b ~|~ a\in A, b\in B, t\in [0,1]\}$,

that is, the set of all line-segments between a point in $A$ and a point in $B$.

Some authors restrict the definition to subsets that are joinable: any two different line-segments, connecting a point of A to a point of B, meet in at most a common endpoint (that is, they do not intersect in their interior). Every two subsets can be made "joinable". For example, if $A$ is in $\mathbb{R}^n$ and $B$ is in $\mathbb{R}^m$, then $A\times\{ 0^m \}\times\{0\}$ and $\{0^n \}\times B\times\{1\}$ are joinable in $\mathbb{R}^{n+m+1}$. The figure above shows an example for m=n=1, where $A$ and $B$ are line-segments.

=== Examples ===
- The join of two simplices is a simplex: the join of an n-dimensional and an m-dimensional simplex is an (m+n+1)-dimensional simplex. Some special cases are:
  - The join of two disjoint points is an interval (m=n=0).
  - The join of a point and an interval is a triangle (m=0, n=1).
  - The join of two line segments is homeomorphic to a solid tetrahedron or disphenoid, illustrated in the figure above right (m=n=1).
  - The join of a point and an (n-1)-dimensional simplex is an n-dimensional simplex.
- The join of a point and a polygon (or any polytope) is a pyramid, like the join of a point and square is a square pyramid. The join of a point and a cube is a cubic pyramid.
- The join of a point and a circle is a cone, and the join of a point and a sphere is a hypercone.

== Topological spaces ==
If $A$ and $B$ are any topological spaces, then:

$$A\star B\ :=\ A\sqcup_{p_0}(A\times B \times [0,1])\sqcup_{p_1}B,$$

where the cylinder $A\times B \times [0,1]$ is attached to the original spaces $A$ and $B$ along the natural projections of the faces of the cylinder:

$${A\times B\times \{0\}} \xrightarrow{p_0} A,$$
$${A\times B\times \{1\}} \xrightarrow{p_1} B.$$

Usually it is implicitly assumed that $A$ and $B$ are non-empty, in which case the definition is often phrased a bit differently: instead of attaching the faces of the cylinder $A\times B \times [0,1]$ to the spaces $A$ and $B$, these faces are simply collapsed in a way suggested by the attachment projections $p_1,p_2$: we form the quotient space

$$A\star B\ :=\ (A\times B \times [0,1] )/ \sim,$$

where the equivalence relation $\sim$ is generated by

$$(a, b_1, 0) \sim (a, b_2, 0) \quad\mbox{for all } a \in A \mbox{ and } b_1,b_2 \in B,$$

$$(a_1, b, 1) \sim (a_2, b, 1) \quad\mbox{for all } a_1,a_2 \in A \mbox{ and } b \in B.$$

At the endpoints, this collapses $A\times B\times \{0\}$ to $A$ and $A\times B\times \{1\}$ to $B$.

If $A$ and $B$ are bounded subsets of the Euclidean space $\mathbb{R}^n$, and $A\subseteq U$ and $B \subseteq V$, where $U, V$ are disjoint subspaces of $\mathbb{R}^n$ such that the dimension of their affine hull is $\dim U + \dim V + 1$ (e.g. two non-intersecting non-parallel lines in $\mathbb{R}^3$), then the topological definition reduces to the geometric definition, that is, the "geometric join" is homeomorphic to the "topological join":

$\big((A\times B \times [0,1] )/ \sim\big) \simeq \{ t\cdot a + (1-t)\cdot b ~|~ a\in A, b\in B, t\in [0,1]\}$

== Abstract simplicial complexes ==
If $A$ and $B$ are any abstract simplicial complexes, then their join is an abstract simplicial complex defined as follows:

- The vertex set $V(A\star B)$ is a disjoint union of $V(A)$ and $V( B)$.
- The simplices of $A\star B$ are all disjoint unions of a simplex of $A$ with a simplex of $B$: $A\star B := \{ a\sqcup b: a\in A, b\in B \}$ (in the special case in which $V(A)$ and $V( B)$ are disjoint, the join is simply $\{ a\cup b: a\in A, b\in B \}$).

=== Examples ===
- Suppose $A = \{ \emptyset, \{a\} \}$ and $B = \{\emptyset, \{b\} \}$, that is, two sets with a single point. Then $A \star B = \{ \emptyset, \{a\}, \{b\}, \{a,b\} \}$, which represents a line-segment. Note that the vertex sets of A and B are disjoint; otherwise, we should have made them disjoint. For example, $A^{\star 2} = A \star A = \{ \emptyset, \{a_1\}, \{a_2\}, \{a_1,a_2\} \}$ where a_{1} and a_{2} are two copies of the single element in V(A). Topologically, the result is the same as $A \star B$ - a line-segment.
- Suppose $A = \{ \emptyset, \{a\} \}$ and $B = \{\emptyset, \{b\}, \{c\}, \{b,c\} \}$. Then $A \star B = P(\{a,b,c\})$, which represents a triangle.
- Suppose $A = \{ \emptyset, \{a\}, \{b\} \}$ and $B = \{\emptyset, \{c\}, \{d\} \}$, that is, two sets with two discrete points. then $A\star B$ is a complex with facets $\{a,c\}, \{b,c\}, \{a,d\}, \{b,d\}$, which represents a "square".

The combinatorial definition is equivalent to the topological definition in the following sense: for every two abstract simplicial complexes $A$ and $B$, $||A\star B||$ is homeomorphic to $||A||\star ||B||$, where $||X||$ denotes any geometric realization of the complex $X$.

== Maps ==
Given two maps $f:A_1\to A_2$ and $g:B_1\to B_2$, their join $f\star g:A_1\star B_1 \to A_2\star B_2$ is defined based on the representation of each point in the join $A_1\star B_1$ as $t\cdot a +(1-t)\cdot b$, for some $a\in A_1, b\in B_1$:

$f\star g ~(t\cdot a +(1-t)\cdot b) ~~=~~ t\cdot f(a) + (1-t)\cdot g(b)$

== Special cases ==
The cone of a topological space $X$, denoted $CX$ , is a join of $X$ with a single point.

The suspension of a topological space $X$, denoted $SX$ , is a join of $X$ with $S^0$ (the 0-dimensional sphere, or, the discrete space with two points).

== Properties ==
=== Commutativity ===
The join of two spaces is commutative up to homeomorphism, i.e. $A\star B\cong B\star A$.

=== Associativity ===
It is not true that the join operation defined above is associative up to homeomorphism for arbitrary topological spaces. However, for locally compact Hausdorff spaces $A, B, C$ we have $(A\star B)\star C \cong A\star(B\star C).$ Therefore, one can define the k-times join of a space with itself, $A^{*k} := A * \cdots * A$ (k times).

It is possible to define a different join operation $A\; \hat{\star}\;B$ which uses the same underlying set as $A\star B$ but a different topology, and this operation is associative for all topological spaces. For locally compact Hausdorff spaces $A$ and $B$, the joins $A\star B$ and $A \;\hat{\star}\;B$ coincide.

=== Homotopy equivalence ===
If $A$ and $A'$ are homotopy equivalent, then $A\star B$ and $A'\star B$ are homotopy equivalent too.

=== Reduced join ===
Given basepointed CW complexes $(A, a_0)$ and $(B, b_0)$, the "reduced join"

$$\frac{A\star B}{A \star \{b_0\} \cup \{a_0\} \star B}$$

is homeomorphic to the reduced suspension

$\Sigma(A\wedge B)$

of the smash product. Consequently, since ${A \star \{b_0\} \cup \{a_0\} \star B}$ is contractible, there is a homotopy equivalence

$$A\star B\simeq \Sigma(A\wedge B).$$

This equivalence establishes the isomorphism $\widetilde{H}_n(A\star B)\cong H_{n-1}(A\wedge B)\ \bigl( =H_{n-1}(A\times B / A\vee B)\bigr)$.

=== Homotopical connectivity ===
Given two triangulable spaces $A, B$, the homotopical connectivity ($\eta_{\pi}$) of their join is at least the sum of connectivities of its parts:

- $\eta_{\pi}(A*B) \geq \eta_{\pi}(A)+\eta_{\pi}(B)$.

As an example, let $A = B = S^0$ be a set of two disconnected points. There is a 1-dimensional hole between the points, so $\eta_{\pi}(A)=\eta_{\pi}(B)=1$. The join $A * B$ is a square, which is homeomorphic to a circle that has a 2-dimensional hole, so $\eta_{\pi}(A * B)=2$. The join of this square with a third copy of $S^0$ is a octahedron, which is homeomorphic to $S^2$ , whose hole is 3-dimensional. In general, the join of n copies of $S^0$ is homeomorphic to $S^{n-1}$ and $\eta_{\pi}(S^{n-1})=n$.

== Deleted join ==
The deleted join of an abstract complex A is an abstract complex containing all disjoint unions of disjoint faces of A:

$A^{*2}_{\Delta} := \{ a_1\sqcup a_2: a_1,a_2\in A, a_1\cap a_2 = \emptyset \}$

=== Examples ===
- Suppose $A = \{ \emptyset, \{a\} \}$ (a single point). Then $A^{*2}_{\Delta} := \{ \emptyset, \{a_1\}, \{a_2\} \}$, that is, a discrete space with two disjoint points (recall that $A^{\star 2} =\{ \emptyset, \{a_1\}, \{a_2\}, \{a_1,a_2\} \}$ = an interval).
- Suppose $A = \{ \emptyset, \{a\} ,\{b\}\}$ (two points). Then $A^{*2}_{\Delta}$ is a complex with facets $\{a_1, b_2\}, \{a_2, b_1\}$ (two disjoint edges).
- Suppose $A = \{ \emptyset, \{a\} ,\{b\}, \{a,b\}\}$ (an edge). Then $A^{*2}_{\Delta}$ is a complex with facets $\{a_1,b_1\}, \{a_1, b_2\}, \{a_2, b_1\}, \{a_2,b_2\}$ (a square). Recall that $A^{\star 2}$ represents a solid tetrahedron.
- Suppose A represents an (n-1)-dimensional simplex (with n vertices). Then the join $A^{\star 2}$ is a (2n-1)-dimensional simplex (with 2n vertices): it is the set of all points (x_{1},...,x_{2n}) with non-negative coordinates such that x_{1}+...+x_{2n}=1. The deleted join $A^{*2}_{\Delta}$ can be regarded as a subset of this simplex: it is the set of all points (x_{1},...,x_{2n}) in that simplex, such that the only nonzero coordinates are some k coordinates in x_{1},..,x_{n}, and the complementary n-k coordinates in x_{n+1},...,x_{2n}.

=== Properties ===
The deleted join operation commutes with the join. That is, for every two abstract complexes A and B:

$(A*B)^{*2}_{\Delta} = (A^{*2}_{\Delta}) * (B^{*2}_{\Delta})$

Proof. Each simplex in the left-hand-side complex is of the form $(a_1 \sqcup b_1) \sqcup (a_2\sqcup b_2)$, where $a_1,a_2\in A, b_1,b_2\in B$, and $(a_1 \sqcup b_1), (a_2\sqcup b_2)$ are disjoint. Due to the properties of a disjoint union, the latter condition is equivalent to: $a_1,a_2$ are disjoint and $b_1,b_2$ are disjoint.

Each simplex in the right-hand-side complex is of the form $(a_1 \sqcup a_2) \sqcup (b_1\sqcup b_2)$, where $a_1,a_2\in A, b_1,b_2\in B$, and $a_1,a_2$ are disjoint and $b_1,b_2$ are disjoint. So the sets of simplices on both sides are exactly the same. □

In particular, the deleted join of the n-dimensional simplex $\Delta^n$ with itself is the n-dimensional crosspolytope, which is homeomorphic to the n-dimensional sphere $S^n$.

=== Generalization ===
The n-fold k-wise deleted join of a simplicial complex A is defined as:

$A^{*n}_{\Delta(k)} := \{ a_1\sqcup a_2 \sqcup\cdots \sqcup a_n: a_1,\cdots,a_n \text{ are k-wise disjoint faces of } A \}$, where "k-wise disjoint" means that every subset of k have an empty intersection.

In particular, the n-fold n-wise deleted join contains all disjoint unions of n faces whose intersection is empty, and the n-fold 2-wise deleted join is smaller: it contains only the disjoint unions of n faces that are pairwise-disjoint. The 2-fold 2-wise deleted join is just the simple deleted join defined above.

The n-fold 2-wise deleted join of a discrete space with m points is called the (m,n)-chessboard complex.

== See also ==
- Desuspension
