= Mónica Clapp =

Mexican mathematician

- Education: Ruprecht-Karls-Universität Heidelberg
- Known for: Nonlinear partial differential equations
- Awards: Member of Mexican Academy of Sciences; Fellow of the American Mathematical Society
- Scientific career
- Fields: Mathematics
- Workplaces: Universidad Nacional Autónoma de México
- Thesis: Dualität in der Kategorie der Spektren von Ex-Räumen (1979)
- Doctoral advisors: Dieter Siegmund Puppe, Albrecht Dold

Mónica Alicia Clapp Jiménez Labora is a mathematician at the Universidad Nacional Autónoma de México (UNAM) known for her work in nonlinear partial differential equations and algebraic topology.

== Life and work ==
Clapp was born in Mexico City. She graduated from UNAM in 1974. Clapp then graduated with her Ph.D from Heidelberg University in 1979, and has been a faculty member at UNAM since that time.

Clapp has been an editor of the journals Boletín de la Sociedad Matemática Mexicana and Aportaciones Matemáticas.

== Awards and honors ==
In 2012, Clapp became a fellow of the American Mathematical Society. She is also a member of the Mexican Academy of Sciences.

In 2018, she received the National Prize for Sciences in the Physics, Mathematics, and Natural Sciences category, "for his outstanding contribution in the fields of nonlinear partial differential equations, variational and topological methods in nonlinear analysis, as well as algebraic topology."

== Selected publications ==
- Clapp, Mónica; Puppe, Dieter Invariants of the Lusternik-Schnirelmann type and the topology of critical sets. Transactions of the American Mathematical Society 298 (1986), no. 2, 603–620.
- Clapp, Mónica; Puppe, Dieter Critical point theory with symmetries. Journal für die reine und angewandte Mathematik 418 (1991), 1–29.
- Bartsch, Thomas; Clapp, Mónica Critical point theory for indefinite functionals with symmetries. Journal of Functional Analysis 138 (1996), no. 1, 107–136.
- Castro, Alfonso; Clapp, Mónica The effect of the domain topology on the number of minimal nodal solutions of an elliptic equation at critical growth in a symmetric domain. Nonlinearity 16 (2003), no. 2, 579–590.
