= Freudenthal suspension theorem =

Establishes the concept of stabilization of homotopy groups

In mathematics, and specifically in the field of homotopy theory, the Freudenthal suspension theorem is the fundamental result leading to the concept of stabilization of homotopy groups and ultimately to stable homotopy theory. It explains the behavior of simultaneously taking suspensions and increasing the index of the homotopy groups of the space in question. It was proved in 1937 by Hans Freudenthal.

The theorem is a corollary of the homotopy excision theorem.

== Statement of the theorem ==
Let X be an n-connected pointed space (a pointed CW-complex or pointed simplicial set). The map

$$X \to \Omega(\Sigma X)$$

induces a map

$$\pi_k(X) \to \pi_k(\Omega(\Sigma X))$$

on homotopy groups, where Ω denotes the loop functor and Σ denotes the reduced suspension functor. The suspension theorem then states that the induced map on homotopy groups is an isomorphism if k ≤ 2n and an epimorphism if k = 2n + 1.

A basic result on loop spaces gives the relation

$$\pi_k(\Omega (\Sigma X)) \cong \pi_{k+1}(\Sigma X)$$

so the theorem could otherwise be stated in terms of the map

$$\pi_k(X) \to \pi_{k+1}(\Sigma X),$$

with the small caveat that in this case one must be careful with the indexing.

=== Proof ===
As mentioned above, the Freudenthal suspension theorem follows quickly from homotopy excision; this proof is in terms of the natural map $\pi_k(X)\to\pi_{k+1}(\Sigma X)$. If a space $X$ is $n$-connected, then the pair of spaces $(CX,X)$ is $(n+1)$-connected, where $CX$ is the reduced cone over $X$; this follows from the relative homotopy long exact sequence. We can decompose $\Sigma X$ as two copies of $CX$, say $(CX)_+, (CX)_-$, whose intersection is $X$. Then, homotopy excision says the inclusion map:

$$((CX)_+, X)\subset (\Sigma X,(CX)_-)$$

induces isomorphisms on $\pi_i, i < 2n+2$ and a surjection on $\pi_{2n+2}$. From the same relative long exact sequence, $\pi_i(X)=\pi_{i+1}(CX,X),$ and since in addition cones are contractible,

$$\pi_i(\Sigma X,(CX)_-)=\pi_i(\Sigma X).$$

Putting this all together, we get

$$\pi_i(X)=\pi_{i+1}((CX)_+,X)=\pi_{i+1}((\Sigma X,(CX)_-)=\pi_{i+1}(\Sigma X)$$

for $i+1<2n+2$, i.e. $i\leqslant 2n$, as claimed above; for $i=2n+1$ the left and right maps are isomorphisms, regardless of how connected $X$ is, and the middle one is a surjection by excision, so the composition is a surjection as claimed.

=== Corollary 1 ===
Let S^{n} denote the n-sphere and note that it is (n − 1)-connected so that the groups $\pi_{n+k}(S^n)$ stabilize for $n \geqslant k+2$ by the Freudenthal theorem. These groups represent the kth stable homotopy group of spheres.

=== Corollary 2 ===
More generally, for fixed k ≥ 1, k ≤ 2n for sufficiently large n, so that any n-connected space X will have corresponding stabilized homotopy groups. These groups are actually the homotopy groups of an object corresponding to X in the stable homotopy category.
