= Homotopy excision theorem =

Offers a substitute for the absence of excision in homotopy theory

In algebraic topology, the homotopy excision theorem offers a substitute for the absence of excision in homotopy theory. More precisely, let $(X; A, B)$ be an excisive triad with $C = A \cap B$ nonempty, and suppose the pair $(A, C)$ is ($m-1$)-connected, $m \ge 2$, and the pair $(B, C)$ is ($n-1$)-connected, $n \ge 1$. Then the map induced by the inclusion $i\colon (A, C) \to (X, B)$,

$$i_*\colon \pi_q(A, C) \to \pi_q(X, B)$$,

is bijective for $q < m+n-2$ and is surjective for $q = m+n-2$.

A geometric proof is given in a book by Tammo tom Dieck.

This result should also be seen as a consequence of the most general form of the Blakers–Massey theorem, which deals with the non-simply-connected case.

The most important consequence is the Freudenthal suspension theorem.

== Bibliography ==
- J. Peter May, A Concise Course in Algebraic Topology, Chicago University Press.
