= Martha Greenblatt =

Hungarian-American chemist

- Born: Martha Katz; 1941 (age 84–85); Debrecen, Hungary
- Education: New Utricht high school, Brooklyn; Brooklyn College
- Relatives: Jason Greenblatt, Eli Rubenstein (nephews)
- Awards: Garvan-Olin Medal (American Chemical Society)
- Scientific career
- Fields: Solid-state chemistry
- Institutions: Rutgers University; Chiclets Chewing Gum Company; Weizmann Institute, Israel; Clarendon Laboratory, Oxford University; Bell Laboratories, Murray Hill,
- Academic advisors: Herman Marks. Rudy Marcus

Martha Greenblatt is a chemist, researcher, and faculty member at Rutgers University, New Brunswick, New Jersey. As of January 2008 she was the only female chair of a science department in the School of Arts and Science. Greenblatt took the position of chair of the chemistry department at Rutgers while pursuing research interests in solid state inorganic chemistry. She was also the recipient of the 2003 American Chemical Society's Garvan-Olin Medal – a national award given yearly to an outstanding woman chemist. In 2004, she became Board of Governors Professor of Chemistry at Rutgers.

== Early life ==
Greenblatt was born Martha Katz in Debrecen, Hungary in 1941. During WW II her father escaped from a Nazi labor camp. Greenblatt, her mother, and 6 month-old brother were on a train to Auschwitz when it changed directions and they were saved. Greenblatt, her mother and brother lived in Vienna until the war ended. They returned to Hungary to their apartment, where they found Greenblatt's father. In October 1956, after attending gymnasium in Debrecen for one year and one month, Hungarians rebelled against the Soviet occupation. During the chaos of the revolt Greenblatt, who was not quite 16 years old at the time, escaped with two friends to Vienna, in December 1956. In January 1957 she arrived in New York City. She enrolled in New Utricht high school in Brooklyn, and then enrolled at Brooklyn College in fall, 1958.

== Family ==
Greenblatt is the first cousin through marriage of Robert Greenblatt, an anti-war activist, who was also deported at a young age from Debrecen to an Austrian labour camp in 1944. She is the aunt of Jason Greenblatt, former executive vice president and chief legal officer to Donald Trump and The Trump Organization, and Holocaust educator, activist, and filmmaker, Eli Rubenstein.

== Education ==
In January 1962 she received a BSc (cum laude) in Chemistry from Brooklyn College. Greenblatt studied under Professor Herman Marks, taking his famous Introduction to Polymer course. Rudy Marcus was her chemical physics professor, who later received the Nobel Prize in Chemistry for work he did at Brooklyn Polytechnic Institute in the 1950s and 1960s. She earned her Ph.D. from the Brooklyn Polytechnic Institute in 1967.

== Career ==
Her first job was as a chemist at the Chiclets Chewing Gum Company in Long Island City. From 1972 to 1973 she was a visiting scientist at the Weizmann Institute in Israel. In 1974 she joined the faculty at Rutgers University. In 1980 she spent a summer as visiting professor at the Clarendon Laboratory at Oxford University in England. She took a sabbatical year at Bell Laboratories in Murray Hill, New Jersey, from 1980 to 1981. Her current position is Professor Rutgers University in New Jersey in the department of Chemistry and Chemical Biology. She is listed as Distinguished Professor by the Board of Governors Professor of Chemistry and Chemical Biology.

== Research ==
Greenblatt's research is in the area of solid-state chemistry, specializing in the synthesis and characterization of quasi-low-dimensional transition metal compounds, fast ionic motion in solids, and high-temperature superconducting materials.

In March 2015, Professor's Greenblatt and Charles Dismukes published a paper stating that they had "documented significant progress confronting one of the main challenges inhibiting widespread utilization of sustainable power: Creating a cost-effective process to store energy so it can be used later." The article announced that the two professors developed a compound that has a chance of replacing platinum in electrochemical cells. With the main idea being about creating cost efficient way of sustaining power. Greenblatt explained that replacing the need for platinum in large applications is something many are and have been working on for years.

== Holocaust education and remembrance work ==
On May 5, 2024, The New York Yankees and International March of the Living organized a block of screen time before the game started to have everyone take part in the afternoon before Holocaust Remembrance day. Dr. Greenblatt recorded message about her life during the Holocaust. which was broadcast before the game. It was played in the Stadium on the game screens. She spoke about being deported out if the ghetto and ending up in a forced-labor camp in Vienna. She also spoke about her gratitude for the opportunity she had been given to come to the United States. She said, "I embraced my new opportunities, and pursued my education with great determination and discipline." Greenblatt is also quoted saying, "However, I can't help but think of the 6 million of our murdered fellow Jews who were not so fortunate and, of the contributions they could have made for the betterment of our world." Speaking on the subject of antisemitism she shared, "I am fearful of the ominous rapid rise of antisemitism and the hatred toward Israel around the world and here in the United States. Especially on university campuses. We need to stand up against antisemitism and racism. Treasure the freedom you have in the USA. Your are fortunate to live in one of the worlds great democracies. Cherish that. And, stand up and fight against antisemitism, racism, and injustice, and stand for human rights for all." Greenblatt ended her video by saying, " What happened to me, could happen again, even here."
