= Puppe sequence =

In mathematics, the Puppe sequence is a construction of homotopy theory, so named after Dieter Puppe. It comes in two forms: a long exact sequence, built from the mapping fibre (a fibration), and a long coexact sequence, built from the mapping cone (which is a cofibration). Intuitively, the Puppe sequence allows us to think of homology theory as a functor that takes spaces to long-exact sequences of groups. It is also useful as a tool to build long exact sequences of relative homotopy groups.

== Exact Puppe sequence ==
A sequence of pointed spaces and pointed maps $\dots \to X_{n+1} \to X_n \to X_{n-1} \to \dots$ is called exact if the induced sequence $\dots \to [Z, X_{n+1}] \to [Z, X_n] \to [Z, X_{n-1}] \to \dots$ is exact as a sequence of pointed sets (taking the kernel of a map to be those elements mapped to the basepoint) for every pointed space $Z$.

Let $f\colon (X,x_0)\to(Y,y_0)$ be a continuous map between pointed spaces and let $Mf$ denote the mapping fibre (the fibration dual to the mapping cone). One then obtains an exact sequence:

$$Mf\to X \to Y$$

where the mapping fibre is defined as:

$$Mf = \{(x,\omega) \in X\times Y^I : \omega(0)=y_0 \mbox{ and } \omega(1)=f(x) \}$$

Observe that the loop space $\Omega Y$ injects into the mapping fibre: $\Omega Y \to Mf$, as it consists of those maps that both start and end at the basepoint $y_0$. One may then show that the above sequence extends to the longer sequence

$$\Omega X \to \Omega Y \to Mf\to X \to Y$$

The construction can then be iterated to obtain the exact Puppe sequence

$$\cdots \to \Omega^2(Mf) \to \Omega^2 X \to \Omega^2 Y \to \Omega(Mf) \to \Omega X \to \Omega Y \to Mf\to X \to Y$$

The exact sequence is often more convenient than the coexact sequence in practical applications, as Joseph J. Rotman explains:

(the) various constructions (of the coexact sequence) involve quotient spaces instead of subspaces, and so all maps and homotopies require more scrutiny to ensure that they are well-defined and continuous.

== Examples ==
=== Example: Relative homotopy ===
As a special case, one may take X to be a subspace A of Y that contains the basepoint y_{0}, and f to be the inclusion $i:A\hookrightarrow Y$ of A into Y. One then obtains an exact sequence in the category of pointed spaces:

$$\begin{align}
\cdots &\to \pi_{n+1}(A) \to \pi_{n+1}(Y) \to \left [S^0,\Omega^n(Mi) \right ]\to \pi_n(A) \to \pi_n(Y)\to\cdots \\
\cdots &\to \pi_1(A) \to \pi_1(Y) \to \left [S^0,Mi \right ]\to \pi_0(A) \to \pi_0(Y)
\end{align}$$

where the $\pi_n$ are the homotopy groups, $S^0$ is the zero-sphere (i.e. two points) and $[U,W]$ denotes the homotopy equivalence of maps from U to W. Note that $\pi_{n+1}(X)=\pi_1(\Omega^n X)$. One may then show that

$$\left [S^0,\Omega^n(Mi) \right ]= \left [S^n,Mi \right ]=\pi_n(Mi)$$

is in bijection to the relative homotopy group $\pi_{n+1}(Y,A)$, thus giving rise to the relative homotopy sequence of pairs

$$\begin{align}
\cdots &\to \pi_{n+1}(A) \to \pi_{n+1}(Y) \to \pi_{n+1}(Y,A) \to \pi_n(A) \to \pi_n(Y)\to\cdots \\
\cdots &\to \pi_1(A) \to \pi_1(Y) \to \pi_1(Y,A)\to \pi_0(A) \to \pi_0(Y)
\end{align}$$

The object $\pi_n(Y,A)$ is a group for $n\ge 2$ and is abelian for $n\ge 3$.

=== Example: Fibration ===
As a special case, one may take f to be a fibration $p:E\to B$. Then the mapping fiber Mp has the homotopy lifting property and it follows that Mp and the fiber $F=p^{-1}(b_0)$ have the same homotopy type. It follows trivially that maps of the sphere into Mp are homotopic to maps of the sphere to F, that is,

$$\pi_n(Mp) = \left [S^n,Mp \right ] \simeq \left [S^n, F \right ] = \pi_n(F).$$

From this, the Puppe sequence gives the homotopy sequence of a fibration:

$$\begin{align}
\cdots &\to \pi_{n+1}(E) \to \pi_{n+1}(B) \to \pi_n(F) \to \pi_n(E) \to \pi_n(B)\to\cdots \\
\cdots &\to \pi_1(E) \to \pi_1(B) \to \pi_0(F)\to \pi_0(E) \to \pi_0(B)
\end{align}$$

=== Example: Weak fibration ===
Weak fibrations are strictly weaker than fibrations, however, the main result above still holds, although the proof must be altered. The key observation, due to Jean-Pierre Serre, is that, given a weak fibration $p\colon E\to B$, and the fiber at the basepoint given by $F=p^{-1}(b_0)$, that there is a bijection

$$p_*\colon \pi_n(E,F)\to\pi_n(B,b_0)$$.

This bijection can be used in the relative homotopy sequence above, to obtain the homotopy sequence of a weak fibration, having the same form as the fibration sequence, although with a different connecting map.

== Coexact Puppe sequence ==
Let $f\colon A \to B$ be a continuous map between CW complexes and let $C(f)$ denote a mapping cone of f, (i.e., the cofiber of the map f), so that we have a (cofiber) sequence:

$$A\to B\to C(f)$$.

Now we can form $\Sigma A$ and $\Sigma B,$ suspensions of A and B respectively, and also $\Sigma f \colon \Sigma A \to \Sigma B$ (this is because suspension might be seen as a functor), obtaining a sequence:

$$\Sigma A \to \Sigma B \to C(\Sigma f)$$.

Note that suspension preserves cofiber sequences.

Due to this powerful fact we know that $C(\Sigma f)$ is homotopy equivalent to $\Sigma C(f).$ By collapsing $B\subset C(f)$ to a point, one has a natural map $C(f) \to \Sigma A.$ Thus we have a sequence:

$$A\to B\to C(f) \to \Sigma A \to \Sigma B \to \Sigma C(f).$$

Iterating this construction, we obtain the Puppe sequence associated to $A\to B$:

$$A\to B\to C(f) \to \Sigma A \to \Sigma B \to \Sigma C(f) \to \Sigma^2 A \to \Sigma^2 B \to \Sigma^2 C(f) \to \Sigma^3 A \to \Sigma^3 B \to \Sigma^3 C(f) \to \cdots$$

== Some properties and consequences ==
It is a simple exercise in topology to see that every three elements of a Puppe sequence are, up to a homotopy, of the form:

$$X\to Y\to C(f)$$.

By "up to a homotopy", we mean here that every 3 elements in a Puppe sequence are of the above form if regarded as objects and morphisms in the homotopy category.

If one is now given a topological half-exact functor, the above property implies that, after acting with the functor in question on the Puppe sequence associated to $A\to B$, one obtains a long exact sequence.

A result, due to John Milnor, is that if one takes the Eilenberg–Steenrod axioms for homology theory, and replaces excision by the exact sequence of a weak fibration of pairs, then one gets the homotopy analogy of the Eilenberg–Steenrod theorem: there exists a unique sequence of functors $\pi_n\colon P\to\bf{Sets}$ with P the category of all pointed pairs of topological spaces.

== Remarks ==
As there are two "kinds" of suspension, unreduced and reduced, one can also consider unreduced and reduced Puppe sequences (at least if dealing with pointed spaces, when it's possible to form reduced suspension).
