= Spherical cone =

A spherical cone may mean:

- a hypercone in 4D
- a spherical sector in 3D

== See also ==
- Spherical conic
