= Horst Schubert =

German mathematician

Horst Schubert (11 June 1919 – 2001) was a German mathematician.

Schubert was born in Chemnitz and studied mathematics and physics at the Universities of Frankfurt am Main, Zürich and Heidelberg, where in 1948 he received his PhD under Herbert Seifert with thesis Die eindeutige Zerlegbarkeit eines Knotens in Primknoten. From 1948 to 1956 Schubert was an assistant in Heidelberg, where he received in 1952 his habilitation qualification. From 1959 he was a professor extraordinarius and from 1962 a professor ordinarius at the University of Kiel. From 1969 to 1984 he was a professor at the University of Düsseldorf.

In 1949 he published his proof that every oriented knot in $S^3$ decomposes as a connect-sum of prime knots in a unique way, up to reordering. After this proof he found a new proof based on his study of incompressible tori in knot complements; he published this work Knoten und Vollringe in Acta Mathematica, where he defined satellite and companion knots. His doctoral students include Theodor Bröcker.

== World War II work ==
During World War II Schubert worked as a mathematician and cryptoanalyst in the Wehrmacht signals intelligence organisation, General der Nachrichtenaufklärung as an expert on Russian and Polish Army Ciphers and Codes as well as Agents codes and ciphers, obtaining the rank of lieutenant (German: Leutnant).

== Selected works ==
- Kategorien. 2 vols. Springer, 1970 (trans. into Eng. by Eva Gray: Categories. Springer-Verlag, 1972 ISBN 0387057838)
- Topologie- Eine Einführung. Teubner, 1969, 3rd edn. 1971 (trans. into Eng. by Siegfried Moran: Topology. Macdonald & Co. 1968 ISBN 0356020770)
- Knoten, Jahresbericht DMV, vol. 69, 1967/68, p. 184

== See also ==
- Satellite knot
