= Light cone =

Set of spacetime events, light-connected to a given event

Light cone in 2D space plus a time dimension, more commonly referred to as 'space time'

In special and general relativity, a light cone (or null cone) is the path that a flash of light, emanating from a single event — localized to a single point in space and a single moment in time — and traveling in all directions, would take through spacetime.

== Details ==
If one imagines the light confined to a two-dimensional plane, the light from the flash spreads out in a circle after the event E occurs, and if the growing circle with the vertical axis representing time is graphed, the result is a cone, known as the future light cone. The past light cone behaves like the future light cone in reverse, a circle which contracts in radius at the speed of light until it converges to a point at the exact position and time of the event E. In reality, there are three space dimensions, so the light would actually form an expanding or contracting sphere in three-dimensional (3D) space rather than a circle in 2D, and the light cone would actually be a four-dimensional version of a cone whose cross-sections form 3D spheres (analogous to a normal three-dimensional cone whose cross-sections form 2D circles), but the concept is easier to visualize with the number of spatial dimensions reduced from three to two.

This view of special relativity was first proposed by Hermann Minkowski and is known as Minkowski space. The purpose was to create an invariant spacetime for all observers. To uphold causality, Minkowski restricted spacetime to non-Euclidean hyperbolic geometry.

Because signals and other causal influences cannot travel faster than light (see special relativity), the light cone plays an essential role in defining the concept of causality: for a given event E, the set of events that lie on or inside the past light cone of E would also be the set of all events that could send a signal that would have time to reach E and influence it in some way. For example, at a time ten years before E, if we consider the set of all events in the past light cone of E which occur at that time, the result would be a sphere (2D: disk) with a radius of ten light-years centered on the position where E will occur. So, any point on or inside the sphere could send a signal moving at the speed of light or slower that would have time to influence the event E, while points outside the sphere at that moment would not be able to have any causal influence on E. Likewise, the set of events that lie on or inside the future light cone of E would also be the set of events that could receive a signal sent out from the position and time of E, so the future light cone contains all the events that could potentially be causally influenced by E. Events which lie neither in the past or future light cone of E cannot influence or be influenced by E in relativity.

== Mathematical construction ==
In special relativity, a light cone (or null cone) is the surface describing the temporal evolution of a flash of light in Minkowski spacetime. This can be visualized in 3-space if the two horizontal axes are chosen to be spatial dimensions, while the vertical axis is time.

The light cone is constructed as follows. Taking as event p a flash of light (light pulse) at time t_{0}, all events that can be reached by this pulse from p form the future light cone of p, while those events that can send a light pulse to p form the past light cone of p.

Given an event E, the light cone classifies all events in spacetime into 5 distinct categories:

- Events on the future light cone of E.
- Events on the past light cone of E.
- Events inside the future light cone of E are those affected by a material particle emitted at E.
- Events inside the past light cone of E are those that can emit a material particle and affect what is happening at E.
- All other events are in the (absolute) elsewhere of E and are those that cannot affect or be affected by E.

The above classifications hold true in any frame of reference; that is, an event judged to be in the light cone by one observer, will also be judged to be in the same light cone by all other observers, no matter their frame of reference.

The above refers to an event occurring at a specific location and at a specific time. To say that one event cannot affect another means that light cannot get from the location of one to the other in a given amount of time. Light from each event will ultimately make it to the former location of the other, but after those events have occurred.

As time progresses, the future light cone of a given event will eventually grow to encompass more and more locations (in other words, the 3D sphere that represents the cross-section of the 4D light cone at a particular moment in time becomes larger at later times). However, if we imagine running time backwards from a given event, the event's past light cone would likewise encompass more and more locations at earlier and earlier times. The farther locations will be at later times: for example, if we are considering the past light cone of an event which takes place on Earth today, a star 10,000 light years away would only be inside the past light cone at times 10,000 years or more in the past. The past light cone of an event on present-day Earth, at its very edges, includes very distant objects (every object in the observable universe), but only as they looked long ago, when the known universe was young.

Two events at different locations, at the same time (according to a specific frame of reference), are always outside each other's past and future light cones; light cannot travel instantaneously. Other observers might see the events happening at different times and at different locations, but one way or another, the two events will likewise be seen to be outside each other's cones.

If using a system of units where the speed of light in vacuum is defined as exactly 1, for example if space is measured in light-seconds and time is measured in seconds, then, provided the time axis is drawn orthogonally to the spatial axes, as the cone bisects the time and space axes, it will show a slope of 45°, because light travels a distance of one light-second in vacuum during one second. Since special relativity requires the speed of light to be equal in every inertial frame, all observers must arrive at the same angle of 45° for their light cones. Commonly a Minkowski diagram is used to illustrate this property of Lorentz transformations. Elsewhere, an integral part of light cones is the region of spacetime outside the light cone at a given event (a point in spacetime). Events that are elsewhere from each other are mutually unobservable, and cannot be causally connected.

(The 45° figure really only has meaning in space-space, as we try to understand space-time by making space-space drawings. Space-space tilt is measured by angles, and calculated with trig functions. Space-time tilt is measured by rapidity, and calculated with hyperbolic functions.)

== In general relativity ==
Light cones near a black hole resulting from a collapsing star. The purple (dashed) line shows the path of a photon emitted from the surface of a collapsing star. The green (dot-dash) line shows the path of another photon shining at the singularity.

In flat spacetime, the future light cone of an event is the boundary of its causal future and its past light cone is the boundary of its causal past.

In a curved spacetime, assuming spacetime is globally hyperbolic, it is still true that the future light cone of an event includes the boundary of its causal future (and similarly for the past). However gravitational lensing can cause part of the light cone to fold in on itself, in such a way that part of the cone is strictly inside the causal future (or past), and not on the boundary.

Light cones also cannot all be tilted so that they are 'parallel'; this reflects the fact that the spacetime is curved and is essentially different from Minkowski space. In vacuum regions (those points of spacetime free of matter), this inability to tilt all the light cones so that they are all parallel is reflected in the non-vanishing of the Weyl tensor.

== See also ==
- Absolute future
- Absolute past
- Hyperbolic partial differential equation
- Hypercone
- Light-cone coordinates
- Lorentz transformation
- Method of characteristics
- Minkowski diagram
- Monge cone
- Wave equation
