= Exact couple =

Algebraic topology

In mathematics, an exact couple, due to William S. Massey (1952), is a general source of spectral sequences. It is common especially in algebraic topology; for example, Serre spectral sequence can be constructed by first constructing an exact couple.

For the definition of an exact couple and the construction of a spectral sequence from it (which is immediate), see Spectral sequence § Spectral sequence of an exact couple. For a basic example, see Bockstein spectral sequence. The present article covers additional materials.

== Exact couple of a filtered complex ==
Let R be a ring, which is fixed throughout the discussion. Note if R is $\Z$, then modules over R are the same thing as abelian groups.

Each filtered chain complex of modules determines an exact couple, which in turn determines a spectral sequence, as follows. Let C be a chain complex graded by integers and suppose it is given an increasing filtration: for each integer p, there is an inclusion of complexes:

$$F_{p-1} C \subset F_p C.$$

From the filtration one can form the associated graded complex:

$$\operatorname{gr} C = \bigoplus_{-\infty}^\infty F_p C/F_{p-1} C,$$

which is doubly-graded and which is the zero-th page of the spectral sequence:

$$E^0_{p, q} = (\operatorname{gr} C)_{p, q} = (F_p C / F_{p-1} C)_{p+q}.$$

To get the first page, for each fixed p, we look at the short exact sequence of complexes:

$$0 \to F_{p-1} C \to F_p C \to (\operatorname{gr}C)_p \to 0$$

from which we obtain a long exact sequence of homologies: (p is still fixed)

$$\cdots \to H_n(F_{p-1} C) \overset{i}\to H_n(F_p C) \overset{j} \to H_n(\operatorname{gr}(C)_p) \overset{k}\to H_{n-1}(F_{p-1} C) \to \cdots$$

With the notation $D_{p, q} = H_{p+q} (F_p C), \, E^1_{p, q} = H_{p + q} (\operatorname{gr}(C)_p)$, the above reads:

$$\cdots \to D_{p - 1, q + 1} \overset{i}\to D_{p, q} \overset{j} \to E^1_{p, q} \overset{k}\to D_{p - 1, q} \to \cdots,$$

which is precisely an exact couple and $E^1$ is a complex with the differential $d = j \circ k$. The derived couple of this exact couple gives the second page and we iterate. In the end, one obtains the complexes $E^r_{*, *}$ with the differential d:

$$E^r_{p, q} \overset{k}\to D^r_{p - 1, q} \overset{{}^r j}\to E^r_{p - r, q + r - 1}.$$

The next lemma gives a more explicit formula for the spectral sequence; in particular, it shows the spectral sequence constructed above is the same one in more traditional direct construction, in which one uses the formula below as definition (cf. Spectral sequence#The spectral sequence of a filtered complex).

Lemma—Let $A^r_p = \{ c \in F_p C \mid d(c) \in F_{p-r} C \}$, which inherits $\mathbb{Z}$-grading from $F_pC$. Then for each p

$$E^r_{p, *} \simeq {A^r_p \over d(A^{r-1}_{p+r-1}) + A^{r-1}_{p-1}}.$$

Sketch of proof: Remembering $d = j \circ k$, it is easy to see:

$$Z^r= k^{-1} (\operatorname{im} i^r), \, B^r = j (\operatorname{ker} i^r),$$

where they are viewed as subcomplexes of $E^1$.

We will write the bar for $F_p C \to F_p C / F_{p-1} C$. Now, if $[\overline{x}] \in Z^{r-1}_{p, q} \subset E^1_{p, q}$, then $k([\overline{x}]) = i^{r-1}([y])$ for some $[y] \in D_{p - r, q + r - 1} = H_{p+q-1}(F_p C)$. On the other hand, remembering k is a connecting homomorphism, $k([\overline{x}]) = [d(x)]$ where x is a representative living in $(F_p C)_{p + q}$. Thus, we can write: $d(x) - i^{r-1}(y) = d(x')$ for some $x' \in F_{p-1}C$. Hence, $[\overline{x}] \in Z^r_p \Leftrightarrow x \in A^r_p$ modulo $F_{p-1} C$, yielding $Z_p^r \simeq (A^r_p + F_{p-1}C)/F_{p-1} C$.

Next, we note that a class in $\operatorname{ker}(i^{r-1}: H_{p+q}(F_pC) \to H_{p+q}(F_{p + r - 1} C))$ is represented by a cycle x such that $x \in d(F_{p+r-1} C)$. Hence, since j is induced by $\overline{\cdot}$, $B^{r-1}_p = j (\operatorname{ker} i^{r-1}) \simeq (d(A^{r-1}_{p+r-1}) + F_{p-1} C)/F_{p-1} C$.

We conclude: since $A^r_p \cap F_{p-1} C = A^{r-1}_{p-1}$,

$$E^r_{p, *} = {Z^{r-1}_p \over B^{r-1}_p} \simeq {A^r_p + F_{p-1} C \over d(A^{r-1}_{p+r-1}) + F_{p-1}C} \simeq {A^r_p \over d(A^{r-1}_{p+r-1}) + A^{r-1}_{p-1}}. \qquad \square$$

Theorem—If $C = \cup_p F_p C$ and for each n there is an integer $s(n)$ such that $F_{s(n)} C_n = 0$, then the spectral sequence E^{r} converges to $H_*(C)$; that is, $E^\infty_{p, q} = F_p H_{p+q}(C)/F_{p-1} H_{p+q}(C)$.

Proof: See the last section of May. $\square$

== Exact couple of a double complex ==
A double complex determines two exact couples; whence, the two spectral sequences, are as follows. (Some authors call the two spectral sequences horizontal and vertical.) Let $K^{p,q}$ be a double complex. With the notation $G^p = \bigoplus_{i \ge p} K^{i, *}$, for each with fixed p, we have the exact sequence of cochain complexes:

$$0 \to G^{p+1} \to G^p \to K^{p, *} \to 0.$$

Taking cohomology of it gives rise to an exact couple:

$$\cdots \to D^{p, q} \overset{j}\to E_1^{p, q} \overset{k}\to \cdots$$

By symmetry, that is, by switching first and second indexes, one also obtains the other exact couple.

== Example: Serre spectral sequence ==
The Serre spectral sequence is a powerful tool used to compute the homology or cohomology of the total space of a fibration. It expresses the singular homology of the total space E in terms of the homology of the base space B and the fiber F.

The sequence arises from a fibration:

$$F \to E \xrightarrow{p} B.$$

For the sake of transparency, we often initially consider the simplified case when the spaces are CW complexes, the fiber F is connected, and the base B is simply connected. In this scenario, the action of the fundamental group of the base on the homology of the fiber is trivial, allowing for the use of constant coefficients. The second page of the homology spectral sequence is given by a Künneth-like tensor product structure:

$$E^2_{p,q} \cong H_p(B; \mathbb{Z}) \otimes H_q(F; \mathbb{Z}) \implies H_{p+q}(E; \mathbb{Z})$$

The general case involves more technicality (namely, local coefficient systems) to handle the non-trivial action of $\pi_1(B)$ on $H_*(F)$. The $E^2$ page then becomes a group homology or cohomology group:

$$E^2_{p,q} \cong H_p(B; H_q(F)).$$
