= Dold manifold =

In mathematics, a Dold manifold is one of the manifolds $P(m,n) = (S^m \times \mathbb{CP}^n)/\tau$, where $\tau$ is the involution that acts as −1 on the m-sphere $S^m$ and as complex conjugation on the complex projective space $\mathbb{CP}^n$. These manifolds were constructed by Albrecht Dold (1956), who used them to give explicit generators for René Thom's unoriented cobordism ring. Note that $P(m,0)=\mathbb{RP}^m$, the real projective space of dimension m, and $P(0,n)=\mathbb{CP}^n$.
