= Günther Frei =

Swiss mathematician and historian of mathematics

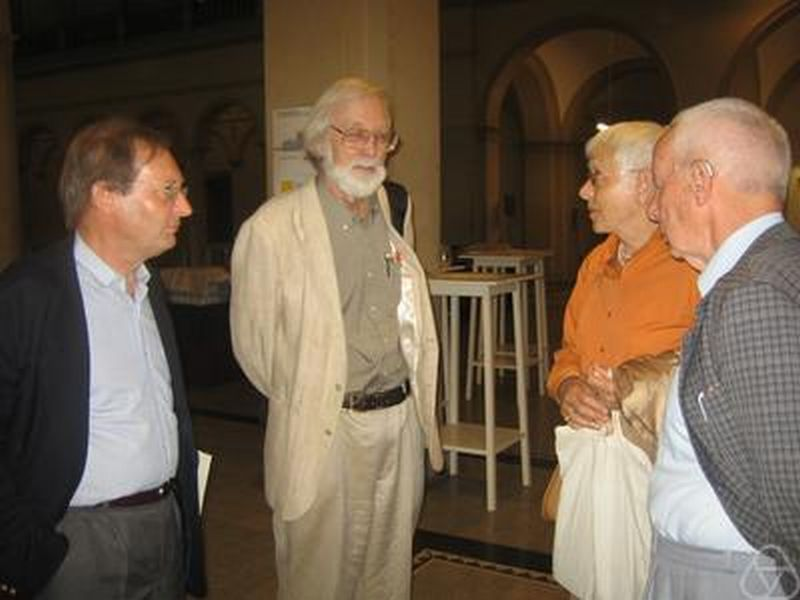
- Günther Frei (left) with John Milnor, Yvonne Dold-Samplonius, Albrecht Dold, Zürich 2007
- Born: May 19, 1942; St. Gallen, Switzerland
- Education: University of Zurich
- Scientific career
- Fields: Number theory, History of mathematics
- Workplaces: Université Laval
- Thesis: Beiträge zur axiomatischen Inhaltstheorie (1968)
- Doctoral advisor: Bartel Leendert van der Waerden

Günther Hans Frei (born 19 May 1942 in St. Gallen) is a Swiss mathematician and historian of mathematics.

== Education and career ==
Frei studied mathematics, physics and languages at the University of Zurich. There he received his doctoral degree in 1968 with advisor Bartel Leendert van der Waerden and dissertation on geometry (Beiträge zur axiomatischen Inhaltstheorie). He became an instructor in 1968 at the University of Notre Dame and in 1970 at Quebec's Université Laval, where he became in 1971 a professor. He remained there until he retired as professor emeritus and returned to Switzerland to live in Hombrechtikon.

Frei's research deals with number theory and the history of mathematics, especially the history of number theory in the 19th and 20th centuries and Swiss mathematics. He has written extensively on the life and work of Helmut Hasse. Frei is a member of the Euler Committee of the Swiss Academy of Sciences.

== Selected publications ==
- Felix Klein. A biographical sketch. In: Jahrbuch Überblicke Mathematik. 1984, pp. 229–254 (and Felix Klein. In: Collection Mathématique. Université Laval, vol. 40, 1981).
- Leben und Werk von Helmut Hasse. In: Collection Mathématique. Université Laval, 1977 (and Helmut Hasse. In: Collection Math. vol. 38, 1981).
- Helmut Hasse. In: Expositiones Mathematicae. vol. 3. 1985, pp. 55–69.
- with Urs Stammbach: Hermann Weyl und die Mathematik an der ETH Zürich 1913–1930. Birkhäuser 1992. at Google Books
- with Urs Stammbach: Die Mathematik an den Zürcher Hochschulen. Birkhäuser 1994. at Google Books
- with Urs Stammbach: Mathematicians and Mathematics in Zürich, at the university and the ETH. Schriftenreihe der ETH-Bibliothek 2007.
- as editor with Peter Roquette: Emil Artin und Helmut Hasse – die Korrespondenz 1923–1934. Universitätsverlag Göttingen 2008 (originally published in 1981 in Collection Mathématique. Universität Laval).
  - 2014 hbk translation; Emil and Helmut Hasse: The Correspondence 1923–1958, 2014 ebook
- as editor: Der Briefwechsel David Hilbert–Felix Klein 1886–1918. Vandenhoeck und Ruprecht 1985.
- with Urs Stammbach: Heinz Hopf. In: Ioan James (ed.): History of Topology. Elsevier 1999.
- The unpublished section eight: on the way to function fields over finite fields. doi:10.1007/978-3-540-34720-0_6 In: Catherine Goldstein, Joachim Schwermer, Norbert Schappacher (eds.) The shaping of arithmetic – after C. F. Gauss´s Disquisitiones Arithmeticae. Springer 2007 (also in Nachrichten Akad. Wiss. Göttingen 2006).
- Heinrich Weber and the emergence of class field theory. doi:10.1016/B978-0-12-599661-7.50019-7 in David Rowe, John McCleary (eds.) History of modern mathematics. Academic Press, 1989, pp. 424–450. (See Heinrich Martin Weber.)
- Chapter 6. Developments in the theory of algebra over number fields: A new foundation for the Hasse norm residue symbol and new approaches to both the Artin reciprocity law and class field theory. in Jeremy Gray, Karen Parshall (eds.): Episodes in the history of modern algebra 1800–1950. American Mathematical Society 2007, pp. 117–151. Chapter 6, 2011 pbk edition
- The reciprocity law from Euler to Eisenstein. doi:10.1007/978-3-0348-7521-9_6 in C. Sasaki, M. Sugiura, Joseph Dauben: The intersection of history and mathematics. Birkhäuser 1994.
