= Double suspension theorem =

Theorem in geometric topology

In geometric topology, the double suspension theorem of James W. Cannon (Cannon (1979)) and Robert D. Edwards states that the double suspension S^{2}X of a homology sphere X is a topological sphere.

If X is a piecewise-linear homology sphere but not a sphere, then its double suspension S^{2}X (with a triangulation derived by applying the double suspension operation to a triangulation of X) is an example of a triangulation of a topological sphere that is not piecewise-linear. The reason is that, unlike in piecewise-linear manifolds, the link of one of the suspension points is not a sphere.

== See also ==
- Disjoint discs property
