= Homotopy group with coefficients =

In topology, a branch of mathematics, for $i \ge 2$, the i-th homotopy group with coefficients in an abelian group G of a based space X is the pointed set of homotopy classes of based maps from the Moore space of type $(G, i)$ to X, and is denoted by $\pi_i(X; G)$. For $i \ge 3$, $\pi_i(X; G)$ is a group. The groups $\pi_i(X; \Z)$ are the usual homotopy groups of X.
