= Eberhard Freitag =

German mathematician

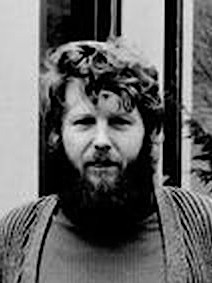
- Eberhard Freitag, Oberwolfach 1977.
- Born: 19 May 1942 (age 84); Mühlacker, Germany
- Education: Heidelberg University(Ph.D. and B.S.)
- Scientific career
- Fields: Mathematics
- Workplaces: Heidelberg University, University of Mainz, Goethe University Frankfurt
- Thesis: Modulformen zweiten Grades zum rationalen und Gaußschen (1966)
- Doctoral advisor: Hans Maaß and Albrecht Dold

Eberhard Freitag (born 19 May 1942, in Mühlacker) is a German mathematician, specializing in complex analysis and especially modular forms.

== Education and career ==
Freitag studied from 1961 mathematics, physics and astronomy at Heidelberg University, where he received in 1964 his Diplom and in 1966 his Ph.D. (promotion), supervised by Hans Maaß (and also Albrecht Dold), with thesis Modulformen zweiten Grades zum rationalen und Gaußschen Zahlkörper, published in Sitzungsberichte Heidelberger Akad. Wiss. 1967. From 1964 he was a research assistant at the Mathematischen Institut in Heidelberg, where he received at the end of 1969 his habilitation and became there a Privatdozent and in 1970 a scientific advisor. In 1970–1971 he was a visiting professor at Johann-Wolfgang-Goethe-Universität Frankfurt am Main. In 1973 he became a professor ordinarius at the University of Mainz. In 1977 he became a professor ordinarius at Heidelberg University, where from 1991 to 1993 he was the dean of the Faculty of Mathematics.

Freitag's research (like that of his teacher Maaß) deals primarily with the theory of modular forms, but approaches modular forms via algebraic geometry. Among other work, Freitag described this theory in two monographs published by Springer Verlag in Grundlehren der mathematischen Wissenschaften. These two books and the first volume of his series on function theory are standard references. In 1974 in Vancouver he was an Invited Speaker of the ICM with talk Singularitäten von Modulmannigfaltigkeiten und Körper Automorpher Funktionen. In 1998 he proved with Rainer Weissauer and Richard Borcherds the existence of a Siegel cusp form of degree 12 and weight 12 using the theta series associated with the 24 Niemeier lattices of dimension 24. Freitag also demonstrated that the Siegel modular variety A_{g} is of general type when g = 8.

== Selected publications ==
- with Rolf Busam: Funktionentheorie 1. Springer-Verlag, 1993, 4th edition 2006, ISBN 3540317643, Complex Analysis, 2006, Eng. trans. of 4th edition
- Funktionentheorie 2: Riemannsche Flächen, Mehrere komplexe Variable, Abelsche Funktionen, Höhere Modulformen, Springer-Verlag, 2009
- Hilbert Modular Forms. Springer-Verlag, Grundlehren der mathematischen Wissenschaften, 1990, ISBN 978-3540505860 2013 pbk reprint
- Singular Modular Forms and Theta Relations. In: Lecture Notes in Mathematics. vol. 1487, Springer-Verlag, 1991, ISBN 3540547045; 2006 pbk reprint
- with Reinhardt Kiehl: Etale Cohomology and the Weil Conjecture, Springer Verlag, 1988, ISBN 978-0387121758
- Siegelsche Modulfunktionen. Springer-Verlag, Berlin 1983, Grundlehren der mathematischen Wissenschaften vol. 254, ISBN 978-3540116615

== Sources ==
- Dagmar Drüll Heidelberger Gelehrtenlexikon 1933-1986, Springer 2009
