= Reinhardt Kiehl =

German mathematician (born 1935–2026)

Reinhardt Kiehl (31 May 1935 – 26 January 2026) was a German mathematician.

== Early life and education ==
Kiehl was born in Herne, North Rhine-Westphalia on 31 May 1935. From 1955, he studied mathematics, physics and astronomy at the University of Göttingen and the University of Heidelberg. He received in 1965 his Ph.D. (promotion) under Friedrich Karl Schmidt at Heidelberg University with thesis Äquivalenzrelationen in analytischen Räumen.

== Career ==
From 1966 to 1968, he was a research assistant and in 1968–1969 a docent at the University of Münster, where he received his habilitation in 1968. From 1969 to 1972, he was a professor ordinarius at the Goethe-Universität Frankfurt am Main. From 1972, he was a professor ordinarius at the University of Mannheim and retired in 2003 as professor emeritus.

== Research ==
Kiehl's research dealt with algebraic and arithmetic geometry and non-archimedean function theory. He wrote a textbook on the Weil conjectures and étale cohomology with Eberhard Freitag. In 1970 Kiehl was an Invited Speaker at the ICM in Nice, France with Hans Grauert, Kohärenzsätze für stetige und differenzierbare Familien komplexer Räume.

== Death ==
Kiehl died on 26 January 2026, at the age of 90.

== Selected publications ==
- with Eberhard Freitag: Etale Cohomology and the Weil Conjecture, Springer Verlag 1988
- with Rainer Weissauer: Weil Conjectures, Perverse Sheaves and ℓ-adic Fourier Transform, Springer Verlag 2001
- De Rham Kohomologie algebraischer Mannigfaltigkeiten über einem bewerteten Körper, Pub. Math. IHES, vol. 33, 1967, pp. 5–20, Online
- Der Endlichkeitssatz für eigentliche Abbildungen in der nichtarchimedischen Funktionentheorie, Inventiones Mathematicae, vol. 2, 1967, pp. 191–214
- Theorem A und B in der nichtarchimedischen Funktionentheorie, Inventiones Mathematicae, vol. 2, 1967, pp. 256–273
- Ausgezeichnete Ringe in der nichtarchimedischen analytischen Geometrie, J. Reine Angewandte Mathematik, vol. 235, 1969, p. 89
- mit Jean-Louis Verdier Ein einfacher Beweis des Kohärenzsatzes von Grauert, Mathematische Annalen, Band 195, 1971, pp. 24–50
- Äquivalenzrelationen in analytischen Räumen, Mathematische Zeitschrift, vol. 105, 1968, pp. 1–20
- Relativ analytische Räume, Inventiones Mathematicae, vol. 16, 1972, pp. 40–112
