= Lehrbuch der Topologie =

German textbook on algebraic topology

In mathematics, Lehrbuch der Topologie (German for "textbook of topology") is a book by Herbert Seifert and William Threlfall, first published in 1934 and published in an English translation in 1980. It was one of the earliest textbooks on algebraic topology, and was the standard reference on this topic for many years.

Albert W. Tucker wrote a review.
