= Yvonne Dold-Samplonius =

Dutch mathematician, historian of mathematics and historian (1937-2014)

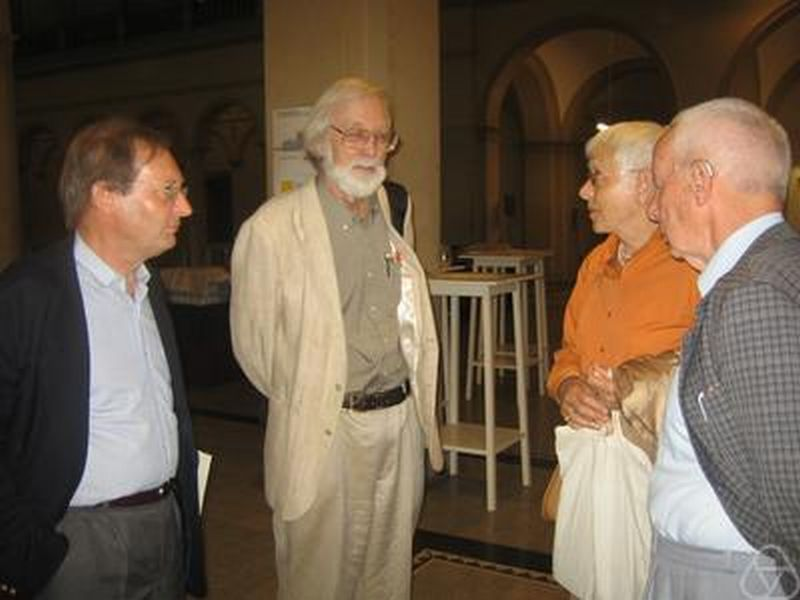
From left: Günther Frei, John Milnor, Yvonne Dold-Samplonius, Albrecht Dold, Zürich 2007

Yvonne Dold-Samplonius (20 May 1937 – 16 June 2014) was a Dutch mathematician and historian who specialised in the history of Islamic mathematics during the Middle Ages. She was particularly interested in the mathematical methods used by Islamic architects and builders of the Middle Ages for measurements of volumes and measurements of religious buildings or in the design of muqarnas.

== Biography ==
Born on 20 May 1937 in Haarlem, Yvonne Samplonius obtained her degree in mathematics and Arabic from the University of Amsterdam (Doktoratsexamen) in 1966. In 1965 Yvonne Dold-Samplonius married the German mathematician Albrecht Dold. During 1966 and 1967, she studied at Harvard University under the direction of Professor John E. Murdoch. In 1977 she was awarded a PhD for her analysis of the treatise Kitāb al-mafrādāt li Aqāţun (Book of Assumptions of Aqātun) under the supervision of Prof. Evert Marie Bruins and Prof. Juan Vernet.

She came into contact with the work of the Persian mathematician, physicist and astronomer Abū Sahl al-Qūhī, who worked in Baghdad in the 10th century and worked on the geometrical forms of buildings. Through his work, she became interested in the geometrical calculations that helped with the building of many of the domes of palaces and mosques, called muqarnas, in the Arab world and Persia. She wrote articles on the Islamic mathematicians Jamshīd al-Kāshī and Abu-Abdullah Muhammad ibn Īsa Māhānī in the Dictionary of the Middle Ages and in the Dictionary of Scientific Biography.

In her later years her interest shifted to the use of mathematics in Islamic architecture from an historic point of view. From 1995, she was an associate member of the Interdisciplinary Centre for Scientific Computing (IWR) of the University of Heidelberg, with whom she has published several videos on Islamic geometrical art. In 1985, she was a visiting professor at the University of Siena. In 2000, she organised with Joseph Dauben the conference "2000 Years of Transmission of Mathematical Ideas". In 2002, she became a Corresponding Member of the International Academy of the History of Sciences and was elected an effective member in 2007. She was made honorary citizen of Kashan in Iran in 2000.

== Publications ==
- 1977: Dissertation: Book of Assumptions by Aqatun (Kitab al-Mafrudat li-Aqatun), Amsterdam
- 1992/3: "Practical Arabic Mathematics: Measuring the Muqarnas by al-Kashi", Centaurus 35: 193–242
- 1996: "How al-Kashi Measures the Muqarnas: A Second Look", in M. Folkerts (editor) Mathematische Probleme im Mittelalter: Der lateinische und arabische Sprachbereich, Wolfenbütteler Mittelalter-Studien Vol. 10, 56 – 90, Wiesbaden
- 2000: "Calculation of Arches and Domes in 15th Century Samarkand", Nexus Network Journal 2(3)
- 2003: "Calculating Surface Areas and Volumes in Islamic Architecture", pages 235 to 265 in The Enterprise of Science in Islam, New Perspectives, editors Jan P. Hogendijk and Abdelhamid I. Sabra, MIT Press
- 2005: (with Silvia L. Harmsen) "The Muqarnas Plate Found at Takht-i Sulaiman, A New Interpretation", Muqarnas 22: 85–94

== Videos ==
- Yvonne Dold-Samplonius, Christoph Kindl, Norbert Quien : Qubba for al-Kashi, Video, Interdisciplinary Centre for Scientific Computing (IWR), Heidelberg University, American Mathematical Society, (1996). Qubba for al-Kashi on YouTube
- Yvonne Dold-Samplonius, Silvia L. Harmsen, Susanne Krömker, Michael Winckler : Magic of Muqarnas, Video, Interdisciplinary Centre for Scientific Computing (IWR), Heidelberg University, (2005).
