= Desuspension =

Mathematical operation inverse to suspension

In topology, a field within mathematics, desuspension is an operation inverse to suspension.

== Definition ==
In general, given an n-dimensional space $X$, the suspension $\Sigma{X}$ has dimension n + 1. Thus, the operation of suspension creates a way of moving up in dimension. In the 1950s, to define a way of moving down, mathematicians introduced an inverse operation $\Sigma^{-1}$, called desuspension. Therefore, given an n-dimensional space $X$, the desuspension $\Sigma^{-1}{X}$ has dimension n – 1.

In general, $\Sigma^{-1}\Sigma{X}\ne X$.

== Reasons ==
The reasons to introduce desuspension:

1. Desuspension makes the category of spaces a triangulated category.
2. If arbitrary coproducts were allowed, desuspension would result in all cohomology functors being representable.

== See also ==
- Cone (topology)
- Equidimensionality
- Join (topology)
