= Blakers–Massey theorem =

Results on triad homotopy groups

In mathematics, the first Blakers–Massey theorem, named after Albert Blakers and William S. Massey, gave vanishing conditions for certain triad homotopy groups of spaces.

== Description of the result ==
This connectivity result may be expressed more precisely, as follows. Suppose X is a topological space which is the pushout of the diagram

$$A\xleftarrow{\ f\ } C \xrightarrow{\ g\ } B$$,

where f is an m-connected map and g is n-connected. Then the map of pairs

$$(A,C)\rightarrow (X,B)$$

induces an isomorphism in relative homotopy groups in degrees $k\le (m+n-1)$ and a surjection in the next degree.

However the third paper of Blakers and Massey in this area determines the critical, i.e., first non-zero, triad homotopy group as a tensor product, under a number of assumptions, including some simple connectivity. This condition and some dimension conditions were relaxed in work of Ronald Brown and Jean-Louis Loday. The algebraic result implies the connectivity result, since a tensor product is zero if one of the factors is zero. In the non simply connected case, one has to use the nonabelian tensor product of Brown and Loday.

The triad connectivity result can be expressed in a number of other ways, for example, it says that the pushout square above behaves like a homotopy pullback up to dimension $m+n$.

== Generalization to higher toposes ==
The generalization of the connectivity part of the theorem from traditional homotopy theory to any other infinity-topos with an infinity-site of definition was given by Charles Rezk in 2010.

== Fully formal proof ==
In 2013 a fairly short, fully formal proof using homotopy type theory as a mathematical foundation and an Agda variant as a proof assistant was announced by Peter LeFanu Lumsdaine; this became Theorem 8.10.2 of Homotopy Type Theory – Univalent Foundations of Mathematics. This induces an internal proof for any infinity-topos (i.e. without reference to a site of definition); in particular, it gives a new proof of the original result.
