= William S. Massey =

American mathematician (1920–2017)

William Schumacher Massey
- Born: August 20, 1920; Granville, Illinois, United States
- Died: June 17, 2017 (aged 96); Hamden, Connecticut, U.S.
- Education: University of Chicago; Princeton University
- Known for: Massey product Blakers–Massey theorem Exact couple
- Spouse: Ethel H. Massey
- Children: 3
- Scientific career
- Fields: Topology
- Workplaces: Brown University; Yale University
- Thesis: Classification of mappings of an (n + 1)-dimensional space into an n-sphere (1948)
- Doctoral advisor: Norman Steenrod
- Military career
- Allegiance: United States
- Branch: United States Navy
- Service years: 1942–1945

William Schumacher Massey (August 23, 1920 – June 17, 2017) was an American mathematician, known for his work in algebraic topology. The Massey product is named for him. He worked also on the formulation of spectral sequences by means of exact couples, and wrote several textbooks, including A Basic Course in Algebraic Topology (ISBN 0-387-97430-X).

== Life ==
William Massey was born in Granville, Illinois, in 1920, the son of Robert and Alma Massey, and grew up in Peoria. He was an undergraduate student at the University of Chicago. After serving as a meteorologist aboard aircraft carriers in the United States Navy for 4 years during World War II, he received a Ph.D. degree from Princeton University in 1949. His dissertation, titled Classification of mappings of an $(n+1)$-dimensional space into an n-sphere, was written under the direction of Norman Steenrod. He spent two additional years at Princeton as a post-doctoral research assistant. He then taught for ten years on the faculty of Brown University. In 1958 he was elected to the American Academy of Arts and Sciences. From 1960 till his retirement he was a professor at Yale University. He died on June 17, 2017, in Hamden, Connecticut. He had 23 PhD students, including Donald Kahn, Larry Smith, and Robert Greenblatt.

== Selected works ==
- Algebraic topology: an introduction. NY: Harcourt, Brace & World. 1967. pp. xix+261. 4th corrected printing. 1977.
- Homology and cohomology theory. Monographs and Textbooks in Pure and Applied Mathematics. Vol. 46. New York: Marcel Dekker. 1978. pp. xiv+412.
- Singular homology theory. Graduate Texts in Mathematics. Springer-Verlag. 1980. pp. xii+265.
- A basic course in algebraic topology. Springer. 1991. ISBN 9780387974309. 3rd corrected printing. 1997.
- Massey, William S. (1952). "Exact couples in algebraic topology. I, II". Annals of Mathematics. Second Series. 56: 363–396. doi:10.2307/1969805. JSTOR 1969805. MR 0052770.

== See also ==
- Blakers–Massey theorem
- Exact couple
- Massey product
