= Herbert Seifert =

German mathematician

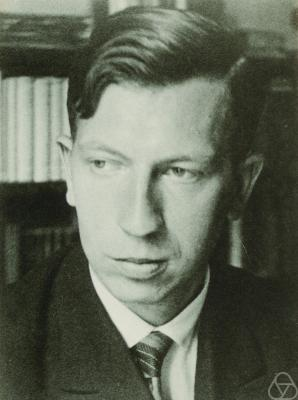
- Born: Herbert Karl Johannes Seifert; May 27, 1907; Bernstadt, German Empire
- Died: October 1, 1996 (aged 89); Heidelberg, Germany
- Occupation: Mathematician
- Known for: Seifert fiber spaces, Seifert–Van Kampen theorem
- Spouse: Katharina Korn (in 13 September 1949)

Academic background
- Thesis: Topologie 3-dimensionaler gefaserter Räume (“Topology of 3-dimensional fibred spaces”) (1 February 1932)

Academic work
- Discipline: Topology
- Institutions: Dresden University of Technology, Leipzig University
- Doctoral students: Albrecht Dold, Dieter Puppe, Horst Schubert
- Main interests: Three-dimensional closed manifolds
- Influenced: William Threlfall, Pavel Alexandrov, Heinz Hopf

Herbert Karl Johannes Seifert (German: [ˈzaɪfɐt]; 27 May 1907, Bernstadt – 1 October 1996, Heidelberg) was a German mathematician known for his work in topology.

== Biography ==
Seifert was born in Bernstadt auf dem Eigen, but soon moved to Bautzen, where he attended primary school at the Knabenbürgerschule, and secondary school at the Oberrealschule.

In 1926 Seifert entered the Dresden University of Technology. The next year he attended a course on topology given by William Threlfall. This would be the beginning both of his lifelong work in the subject and his friendship with Threlfall. In the year 1928–29 he visited the University of Göttingen, where topologists such as Pavel Sergeevich Alexandrov and Heinz Hopf were working.

In 1930 he received his doctorate with his work on three-dimensional closed manifolds (which contains the Seifert–van Kampen theorem). He then moved to the University of Leipzig, where he received his second doctorate in 1932. It was here that Seifert submitted his dissertation, Topologie 3-dimensionaler gefaserter Räume (“Topology of 3-dimensional fibred spaces”), on 1 February 1932, and he was awarded with this doctorate of philosophy after his oral examination on March 3. The manifolds he studied in his thesis were afterwards named Seifert fiber spaces.

Seifert continued to collaborate with Threlfall, and in 1934 (the year Seifert received his habilitation) they published their Lehrbuch der Topologie. In 1938 they published Variationsrechnung im Grossen.

In 1935, Seifert was summoned to a post at the University of Heidelberg, where he took a position vacated by the dismissal of a Jewish professor. During World War II he volunteered for a position at a Luftwaffe research center, the Institut für Gasdynamik. After the war, Seifert was one of the few German professors whom the Allies trusted during the period of denazification.

In the year 1948–49 Seifert visited the Institute for Advanced Study in Princeton, New Jersey. On 13 September 1949, soon after returning to Germany, he married Katharina Korn.

Seifert retired in 1975. His students include Albrecht Dold, Dieter Puppe, and Horst Schubert.

== See also ==
- Seifert surface
- Seifert–van Kampen theorem
- Seifert conjecture
- Seifert–Weber space
