= Cone (topology) =

Transformation of a topological space

Cone of a circle. The original space X is in blue, and the collapsed end point v is in green.

In topology, especially algebraic topology, the cone of a topological space $X$ is intuitively obtained by stretching X into a cylinder and then collapsing one of its end faces to a point. The cone of X is denoted by $CX$ or by $\operatorname{cone}(X)$.

== Definitions ==
Formally, the cone of X is defined as:

$$CX = (X \times [0,1])\cup_p v\ =\ \varinjlim \bigl( (X \times [0,1]) \hookleftarrow (X\times \{0\}) \xrightarrow{p} v\bigr),$$

where $v$ is a point (called the vertex of the cone) and $p$ is the projection to that point. In other words, it is the result of attaching the cylinder $X \times [0,1]$ by its face $X\times\{0\}$ to a point $v$ along the projection $p: \bigl( X\times\{0\} \bigr)\to v$.

If $X$ is a non-empty compact subspace of Euclidean space, the cone on $X$ is homeomorphic to the union of segments from $X$ to any fixed point $v \not\in X$ such that these segments intersect only in $v$ itself. That is, the topological cone agrees with the geometric cone for compact spaces when the latter is defined. However, the topological cone construction is more general.

The cone is a special case of a join: $CX \simeq X\star \{v\} =$ the join of $X$ with a single point $v\not\in X$.

== Examples ==
Here we often use a geometric cone ($C X$ where $X$ is a non-empty compact subspace of Euclidean space). The considered spaces are compact, so we get the same result up to homeomorphism.

- The cone over a point p of the real line is a line-segment in $\mathbb{R}^2$, $\{p\} \times [0,1]$.
- The cone over two points {0, 1} is a "V" shape with endpoints at {0} and {1}.
- The cone over a closed interval I of the real line is a filled-in triangle (with one of the edges being I), otherwise known as a 2-simplex (see the final example).
- The cone over a polygon P is a pyramid with base P.
- The cone over a disk is the solid cone of classical geometry (hence the concept's name).
- The cone over a circle given by

$$\{(x,y,z) \in \R^3 \mid x^2 + y^2 = 1 \mbox{ and } z=0\}$$

is the curved surface of the solid cone:

$$\{(x,y,z) \in \R^3 \mid x^2 + y^2 = (z-1)^2 \mbox{ and } 0\leq z\leq 1\}.$$

This in turn is homeomorphic to the closed disc.

More general examples:

- The cone over an n-sphere is homeomorphic to the closed (n + 1)-ball.
- The cone over an n-ball is also homeomorphic to the closed (n + 1)-ball.
- The cone over an n-simplex is an (n + 1)-simplex.

== Properties ==
All cones are path-connected since every point can be connected to the vertex point. Furthermore, every cone is contractible to the vertex point by the homotopy

$$h_t(x,s) = (x, (1-t)s)$$.

The cone is used in algebraic topology precisely because it embeds a space as a subspace of a contractible space.

When X is compact and Hausdorff (essentially, when X can be embedded in Euclidean space), then the cone $CX$ can be visualized as the collection of lines joining every point of X to a single point. However, this picture fails when X is not compact or not Hausdorff, as generally the quotient topology on $CX$ will be finer than the set of lines joining X to a point.

== Cone functor ==
The map $X\mapsto CX$ induces a functor $C\colon \mathbf{Top}\to\mathbf{Top}$ on the category of topological spaces Top. If $f \colon X \to Y$ is a continuous map, then $Cf \colon CX \to CY$ is defined by

$$(Cf)([x,t])=[f(x),t]$$,

where square brackets denote equivalence classes.

== Reduced cone ==
If $(X,x_0)$ is a pointed space, there is a related construction, the reduced cone, given by

$$(X\times [0,1]) / (X\times \left\{0\right\}
\cup\left\{x_0\right\}\times [0,1])$$

where we take the basepoint of the reduced cone to be the equivalence class of $(x_0,0)$. With this definition, the natural inclusion $x\mapsto (x,1)$ becomes a based map. This construction also gives a functor, from the category of pointed spaces to itself.

== See also ==
- Cone (disambiguation)
- Suspension (topology)
- Desuspension
- Mapping cone (topology)
- Join (topology)
