= Suspension (topology) =

Concept in mathematics

Suspension of a circle. The original space is in blue, and the collapsed end points are in green.

In topology, a branch of mathematics, the suspension of a topological space X is intuitively obtained by stretching X into a cylinder and then collapsing both end faces to points. One views X as "suspended" between these end points. The suspension of X is denoted by SX or susp(X).

There is a variant of the suspension for a pointed space, which is called the reduced suspension and denoted by ΣX. The "usual" suspension SX is sometimes called the unreduced suspension, unbased suspension, or free suspension of X, to distinguish it from ΣX.

== Free suspension ==
The (free) suspension $SX$ of a topological space $X$ can be defined in several ways.

1. $SX$ is the quotient space $(X \times [0,1])/(X\times \{0\})\big/ ( X\times \{1\}).$ In other words, it can be constructed as follows:

- Construct the cylinder $X \times [0,1]$.
- Consider the entire set $X\times \{0\}$ as a single point ("glue" all its points together).
- Consider the entire set $X\times \{1\}$ as a single point ("glue" all its points together).

2. Another way to write this is:

$SX := v_0 \cup_{p_0}(X \times [0,1])\cup_{p_1} v_1\ =\ \varinjlim_{i \in \{0,1\}} \bigl( (X \times [0,1]) \hookleftarrow (X\times \{i\}) \xrightarrow{p_i} v_i\bigr),$

Where $v_0, v_1$ are two points, and for each i in {0,1}, $p_i$ is the projection to the point $v_i$ (a function that maps everything to $v_i$). That means, the suspension $SX$ is the result of constructing the cylinder $X \times [0,1]$, and then attaching it by its faces, $X\times\{0\}$ and $X\times\{1\}$, to the points $v_0, v_1$ along the projections $p_i: \bigl( X\times\{i\} \bigr)\to v_i$.

3. One can view $SX$ as two cones on X, glued together at their bases.

4. $SX$ can also be defined as the join $X\star S^0,$ where $S^0$ is a discrete space with two points.

5. In Homotopy type theory, $SX$ is defined as a higher inductive type generated by

S: $SX$

N:$SX$

$Merid: \bigl( X\bigr)\to (N=S)$

=== Properties ===
In rough terms, S increases the dimension of a space by one: for example, it takes an n-sphere to an (n + 1)-sphere for n ≥ 0.

Given a continuous map $f:X\rightarrow Y,$ there is a continuous map $Sf:SX\rightarrow SY$ defined by $Sf([x,t]):=[f(x),t],$ where square brackets denote equivalence classes. This makes $S$ into a functor from the category of topological spaces to itself.

== Reduced suspension ==
If X is a pointed space with basepoint x_{0}, there is a variation of the suspension which is sometimes more useful. The reduced suspension or based suspension ΣX of X is the quotient space:

$$\Sigma X = (X\times I)/(X\times\{0\}\cup X\times\{1\}\cup \{x_0\}\times I)$$.

This is the equivalent to taking SX and collapsing the line (x_{0} × I ) joining the two ends to a single point. The basepoint of the pointed space ΣX is taken to be the equivalence class of (x_{0}, 0).

One can show that the reduced suspension of X is homeomorphic to the smash product of X with the unit circle S^{1}.

$$\Sigma X \cong S^1 \wedge X$$

For well-behaved spaces, such as CW complexes, the reduced suspension of X is homotopy equivalent to the unbased suspension.

=== Adjunction of reduced suspension and loop space functors ===
Σ gives rise to a functor from the category of pointed spaces to itself. An important property of this functor is that it is left adjoint to the functor $\Omega$ taking a pointed space $X$ to its loop space $\Omega X$. In other words, we have a natural isomorphism

$$\operatorname{Maps}_*\left(\Sigma X,Y\right) \cong \operatorname{Maps}_*\left(X,\Omega Y\right)$$

where $X$ and $Y$ are pointed spaces and $\operatorname{Maps}_*$ stands for continuous maps that preserve basepoints. This adjunction can be understood geometrically, as follows: $\Sigma X$ arises out of $X$ if a pointed circle is attached to every non-basepoint of $X$, and the basepoints of all these circles are identified and glued to the basepoint of $X$. Now, to specify a pointed map from $\Sigma X$ to $Y$, we need to give pointed maps from each of these pointed circles to $Y$. This is to say we need to associate to each element of $X$ a loop in $Y$ (an element of the loop space $\Omega Y$), and the trivial loop should be associated to the basepoint of $X$: this is a pointed map from $X$ to $\Omega Y$. (The continuity of all involved maps needs to be checked.)

The adjunction is thus akin to currying, taking maps on cartesian products to their curried form, and is an example of Eckmann–Hilton duality.

This adjunction is a special case of the adjunction explained in the article on smash products.

=== Applications ===
The reduced suspension can be used to construct a homomorphism of homotopy groups, to which the Freudenthal suspension theorem applies. In homotopy theory, the phenomena which are preserved under suspension, in a suitable sense, make up stable homotopy theory.

== Examples ==
Some examples of suspensions are:

- The suspension of an n-ball is homeomorphic to the (n+1)-ball.

== Desuspension ==
Desuspension is an operation partially inverse to suspension.

== See also ==
- Double suspension theorem
- Cone (topology)
- Join (topology)
