= Excisive triad =

In topology, a branch of mathematics, an excisive triad is a triple $(X; A, B)$ of topological spaces such that A, B are subspaces of X and X is the union of the interior of A and the interior of B. Note B is not required to be a subspace of A.

== See also ==
- Homotopy excision theorem
