= Urs Stammbach =

Swiss mathematician

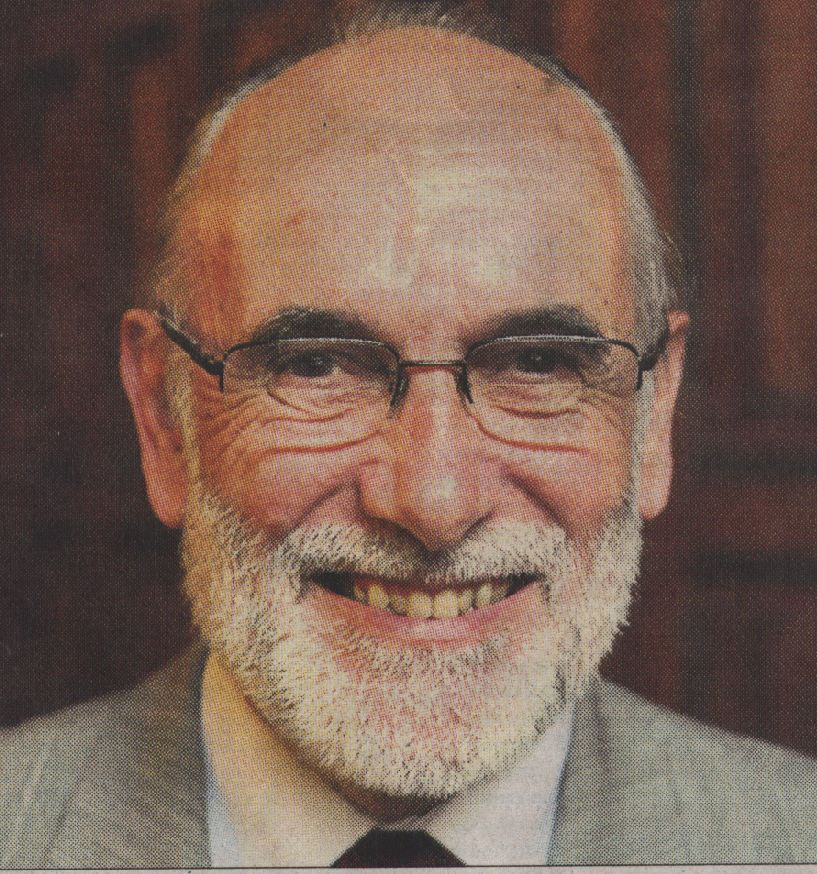
Urs Stammbach (ca. 2005)

Urs Stammbach (born 26 October 1939) is a Swiss mathematician, specializing in homological algebra.

Stammbach studied at ETH Zurich, where he obtained his Diplom in 1964 and received his doctorate in 1966 under the supervision of Beno Eckmann (and Heinz Hopf) with dissertation Anwendungen der Homologietheorie der Gruppen auf Zentralreihen und auf Invarianten von Präsentierungen (Applications of homology theory of groups to central series and to invariants of presentations). As a postdoc Stammbach was from 1966 to 1967 at ETH Zurich and from 1967 to 1969 at Cornell University. At ETH Zurich, he was from 1969 to 1972 an assistant professor, from 1972 to 1979 an associate professor, and from 1979 to 2005 a full professor, retiring as professor emeritus in 2005.

Stammbach's research deals with homological algebra, specifically with its applications to group theory (homology and cohomology of groups). He also does research on the history of mathematics, especially pertaining to Switzerland.

In 1990–1991 he was president of the Swiss Mathematical Society.

== Selected publications ==
- Homology in group theory, Springer 1971
- with Peter Hilton: On the differentials in the Lyndon-Hochschild-Serre spectral sequence, Bull. Amer. Math. Soc., Vol. 79, 1973, pp. 796–799 doi:10.1090/S0002-9904-1973-13321-X (See Lyndon–Hochschild–Serre spectral sequence.)
- Homologie dans les variétés des groupes. Groupes à dualité homologique, Université Laval, Quebec, Collect. Math., No. 19, 1976
- Geschichte der Mathematik an der ETH Zürich 1855–1932, Jahrbuch Überblicke Mathematik, Vieweg 1994, pp. 194–216
- with Günther Frei: Die Mathematiker an den Zürcher Hochschulen, Birkhäuser 1994
- with Günther Frei: Hermann Weyl und die Mathematik an der ETH Zürich 1913–1930, Birkhäuser 1992
- with Günther Frei: Heinz Hopf, in Ioan James: History of Topology, Elsevier 1999
- with Peter Hilton: A course in homological algebra, 1st edition 1971, 2nd edition, Springer 1997, ISBN 3-540-90032-2 2nd corrected printing. 2013.
- Lineare Algebra, Teubner Verlag 1980, 4th edition 1994
