= Dieter Puppe =

German mathematician (1930–2005)

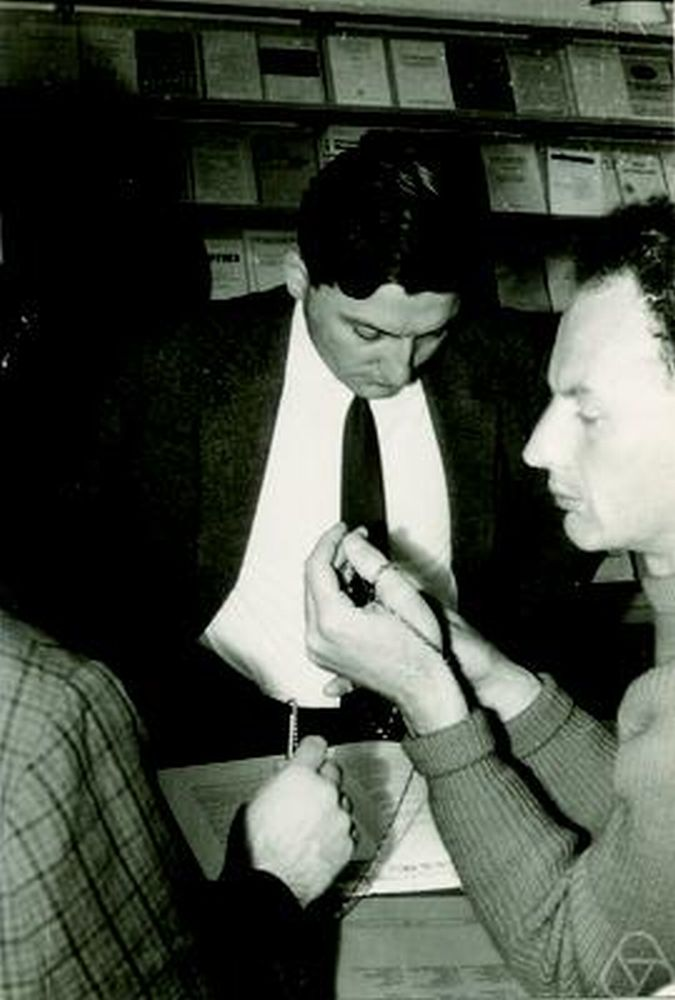
Dieter Puppe (middle) with John Frank Adams in 1962, in Aarhus.

Siegmund Dieter Puppe (16 December 1930 – 13 August 2005) was a German mathematician who worked in algebraic topology, differential topology and homological algebra. He is known for the Puppe sequence in algebraic topology.

== Life ==
Dieter Puppe was born the son of the lawyer Siegmund Puppe. The mathematician Volker Puppe (born 1938) and the legal scholar Ingeborg Puppe (born 1941) were his siblings. From 1948 he studied physics and mathematics in University of Göttingen and from 1951 at Heidelberg University. In 1954 he received his doctorate under Herbert Seifert (On the homotopy of images of a polyhedron. Mathematische Zeitschrift Bd. 61, 1954, S. 303). From 1951 he was an assistant in Heidelberg and after his habilitation in 1957, a lecturer. In 1960 he became a professor in Saarbrücken. In 1968 he returned to Heidelberg, where he stayed until his retirement in 1996, apart from guest stays at the Institute for Advanced Study in Princeton in 1957/58, in Chicago in 1961, and in Minneapolis in 1966/67.

Puppe worked on knot theory (with Martin Kneser as early as the 1950s) and homotopy theory.

From 1972 he was a member of the Heidelberg Academy of Sciences. In 1962 he gave a lecture at the International Congress of Mathematicians in Stockholm (Korrespondenzen in abelschen Kategorien).

His students included Tammo tom Dieck, Hans-Werner Henn, and Rudolf Fritsch.

== Works ==
- with Hans-Berndt Brinkmann: Kategorien und Funktoren (= Lecture Notes in Mathematics. 18). Springer, Berlin u. a. 1966.
- Stabile Homotopietheorie I. In: Mathematische Annalen. Bd. 169, Nr. 2, 1967, S. 243–274.
- Einhängungssätze im Aufbau der Homotopietheorie. In: Jahresbericht der Deutschen Mathematiker-Vereinigung. Bd. 71, 1969, S. 48–54.
- with Hans-Berndt Brinkmann: Abelsche und exakte Kategorien, Korrespondenzen (= Lecture Notes in Mathematics. 96). Springer, Berlin u. a. 1969.
- with Tammo tom Dieck, Klaus Heiner Kamps: Homotopietheorie (= Lecture Notes in Mathematics. 157). Springer, Berlin u. a. 1970, ISBN 3-540-05185-6 (originated by a lecture by Puppe at the University of Minnesota 1966/67).
- with Hans-Werner Henn: Algebraische Topologie. In: Gerd Fischer, Friedrich Hirzebruch, Winfried Scharlau, Willi Törnig (Hrsg.): Ein Jahrhundert Mathematik 1890–1990. Festschrift zum Jubiläum des DMV (= Dokumente zur Geschichte der Mathematik. 6). Vieweg, Braunschweig u. a. 1990, ISBN 3-528-06326-2, S. 673–716.

== Literature ==
- Puppe, Dieter. In: Dagmar Drüll: Heidelberger Gelehrtenlexikon. Bd. 3, Heidelberg 2009, S. 476.

== See also ==
- Puppe sequence
