= William Threlfall =

German mathematician

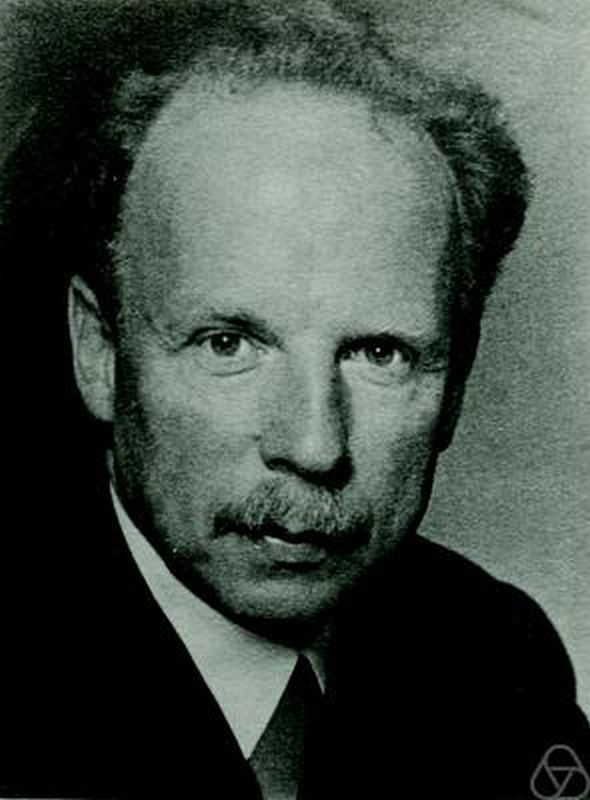
William Threlfall in 1936

William Richard Maximilian Hugo Threlfall (25 June 1888, in Dresden – 4 April 1949, in Oberwolfach) was a British-born German mathematician who worked on algebraic topology. He was a coauthor of the standard textbook Lehrbuch der Topologie.

In 1933 he signed the Vow of allegiance of the Professors of the German Universities and High-Schools to Adolf Hitler and the National Socialistic State.

== Publications ==
- Threlfall, W. (1932), "Gruppenbilder" (PDF), Abh. Math.-Phys. Kl. Sächs. Akad. Wiss., 41, Leipzig: Hirzel: 1–59
- Seifert, Threlfall: Lehrbuch der Topologie, Teubner 1934
- Seifert, Threlfall: Variationsrechnung im Großen, Teubner 1938

== See also ==
- Möbius–Kantor graph
- Schwarz triangle tessellation
