= Hypercone =

4-dimensional figure

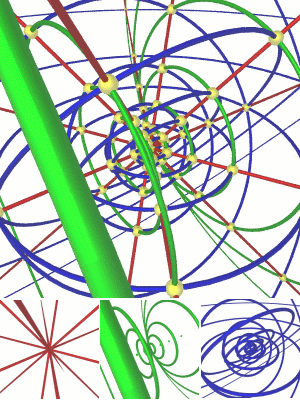
Stereographic projection of a spherical cone's generating lines (red), parallels (green) and hypermeridians (blue). Because stereographic projection is conformal, the curves intersect each other orthogonally (in the yellow points) as in 4D. All curves are circles or straight lines. The generatrices and parallels generates a 3D dual cone. The hypermeridians generates a set of concentric spheres.

In geometry, a hypercone (or spherical cone) is the figure in the 4-dimensional Euclidean space represented by the equation

$$x^2 + y^2 + z^2 - w^2 = 0.$$

It is a quadric surface, and is one of the possible 3-manifolds which are 4-dimensional equivalents of the conical surface in 3 dimensions. It is also named "spherical cone" because its intersections with hyperplanes perpendicular to the w-axis are spheres. A four-dimensional right hypercone can be thought of as a sphere which expands with time, starting its expansion from a single point source, such that the center of the expanding sphere remains fixed. An oblique hypercone would be a sphere which expands with time, again starting its expansion from a point source, but such that the center of the expanding sphere moves with a uniform velocity.

== Parametric form ==
A right spherical hypercone can be described by the function

$$\vec \sigma (\phi, \theta, t) = (t s \cos \theta \cos \phi, t s \cos \theta \sin \phi, t s \sin \theta, t)$$

with vertex at the origin and expansion speed s.

A right spherical hypercone with radius r and height h can be described by the function

$$\vec \sigma (\phi, \theta, t) = \left(t \cos \phi \sin \theta, t \sin \phi \sin \theta, t \cos \theta, \frac{h}{r}t\right)$$

An oblique spherical hypercone could then be described by the function

$$\vec \sigma (\phi, \theta, t) = (v_x t + t s \cos \theta \cos \phi, v_y t + t s \cos \theta \sin \phi, v_z t + t s \sin \theta, t)$$

where $(v_x, v_y, v_z)$ is the 3-velocity of the center of the expanding sphere. An example of such a cone would be an expanding sound wave as seen from the point of view of a moving reference frame: e.g. the sound wave of a jet aircraft as seen from the jet's own reference frame.

Note that the 3D-surfaces above enclose 4D-hypervolumes, which are the 4-cones proper.

== Geometrical interpretation ==
The spherical cone consists of two unbounded nappes, which meet at the origin and are the analogues of the nappes of the 3-dimensional conical surface. The upper nappe corresponds with the half with positive w-coordinates, and the lower nappe corresponds with the half with negative w-coordinates.

If it is restricted between the hyperplanes w = 0 and w = r for some nonzero r, then it may be closed by a 3-ball of radius r, centered at (0,0,0,r), so that it bounds a finite 4-dimensional volume. This volume is given by the formula 1/3πr^{4}, and is the 4-dimensional equivalent of the solid cone. The ball may be thought of as the 'lid' at the base of the 4-dimensional cone's nappe, and the origin becomes its 'apex'.

This shape may be projected into 3-dimensional space in various ways. If projected onto the xyz hyperplane, its image is a ball. If projected onto the xyw, xzw, or yzw hyperplanes, its image is a solid cone. If projected onto an oblique hyperplane, its image is either an ellipsoid or a solid cone with an ellipsoidal base (resembling an ice cream cone). These images are the analogues of the possible images of the solid cone projected to 2 dimensions.

=== Construction ===
The (half) hypercone may be constructed in a manner analogous to the construction of a 3D cone. A 3D cone may be thought of as the result of stacking progressively smaller discs on top of each other until they taper to a point. Alternatively, a 3D cone may be regarded as the volume swept out by an upright isosceles triangle as it rotates about its axis of symmetry.

A 4D hypercone may be constructed analogously: by stacking progressively smaller balls on top of each other in the 4th direction until they taper to a point, or taking the hypervolume swept out by a 3D cone standing upright in the 4th direction as it rotates freely about any of its planes of symmetry.

== Measurements ==
=== Hypervolume ===
The hypervolume of a four-dimensional pyramid and cone is

$$H=\frac{1}{4}Vh$$

where V is the volume of the base and h is the height (the distance between the centre of the base and the apex). For a spherical cone with a base volume of $V=\frac{4}{3}\pi r^3$, the hypervolume is

$$H=\frac{1}{4}Vh=\frac{1}{4}\left(\frac{4}{3}\pi r^3\right)h=\frac{1}{3}\pi r^3h$$

=== Surface volume ===
The lateral surface volume of a right spherical cone is $LSV = \frac{4}{3}\pi r^2 l$ where $r$ is the radius of the spherical base and $l$ is the slant height of the cone (the distance between the 2D surface of the sphere and the apex). The surface volume of the spherical base is the same as for any sphere, $\frac{4}{3}\pi r^3$. Therefore, the total surface volume of a right spherical cone can be expressed in the following ways:

- Radius and height

$\frac{4}{3}\pi r^3 + \frac{4}{3}\pi r^2 \sqrt{r^2+h^2}$

(the volume of the base plus the volume of the lateral 3D surface; the term $\sqrt{r^2+h^2}$ is the slant height)

$\frac{4}{3}\pi r^2 \left(r + \sqrt{r^2+h^2}\right)$

where $r$ is the radius and $h$ is the height.

- Radius and slant height

$\frac{4}{3}\pi r^3 + \frac{4}{3}\pi r^2 l$

$\frac{4}{3}\pi r^2 \left(r + l\right)$

where $r$ is the radius and $l$ is the slant height.

- Surface area, radius, and slant height

$\frac{1}{3}Ar + \frac{1}{3}Al$

$\frac{1}{3}A\left(r + l\right)$

where $A$ is the base surface area, $r$ is the radius, and $l$ is the slant height.

== Temporal interpretation ==
If the w-coordinate of the equation of the spherical cone is interpreted as the distance ct, where t is coordinate time and c is the speed of light (a constant), then it is the shape of the light cone in special relativity. In this case, the equation is usually written as:

$$x^2 + y^2 + z^2 - (ct)^2 = 0,$$

which is also the equation for spherical wave fronts of light. The upper nappe is then the future light cone and the lower nappe is the past light cone.

== See also ==
- 3-sphere
- Hypercube
- Hyperplane
- Hypersurface
- Manifold
- Light cone
