= Jason Greenblatt =

American lawyer (born 1967)

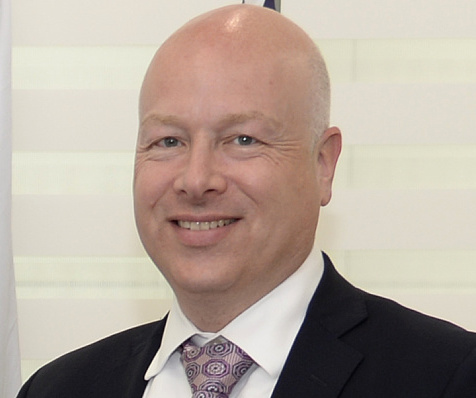

Special Representative for International Negotiations
- In office January 20, 2017 – October 31, 2019
- President: Donald Trump
- Preceded by: Position established
- Succeeded by: Avi Berkowitz

Personal details
- Born: Jason Dov Greenblatt; March 30, 1967 (age 59) Teaneck, NJ
- Party: Republican
- Spouse: Naomi Greenblatt
- Children: 6
- Education: Yeshiva University (BA); New York University (JD)

Jason Dov Greenblatt (born March 30, 1967) is an American lawyer. He was the executive vice president and chief legal officer to Donald Trump and The Trump Organization, and his advisor on Israel. In January 2017, he was appointed as an Assistant to the President and Special Representative for International Negotiations by President Donald Trump.

== Early life and education ==
Greenblatt is the son of Hungarian Jewish refugees, and grew up in Forest Hills, Queens, New York City. During World War II, his father fled Szatmárcseke in 1941 as a child, while his mother hid in Budapest with her family during the Nazi occupation, and fled to the United States after the Hungarian Revolution in 1956. He was born with the given name Theodore but had it legally changed as a teenager. He is the first cousin, once removed, of anti-war activist Robert Greenblatt.

Greenblatt was educated at Yeshiva Dov Revel, the Marsha Stern Talmudical Academy, followed by Yeshivat Har Etzion and then Yeshiva University where he studied English. In 1992, Greenblatt received a Juris Doctor from the New York University School of Law.

== Career ==
Greenblatt started as real estate lawyer for the New York law firm, Fried, Frank, Harris, Shriver & Jacobson. In the mid-1990s, he started a cappuccino coffee company, with pod machines at Penn Station and the New York City airports, but following the rise of Starbucks, sold his business and returned to practicing law. Greenblatt is the creator of the blog Inspire Conversation, a collection of resources for parents and teens, as well as the author of three travel books, one about a family trip to Israel.

Greenblatt has worked for Trump since 1997, rising to executive vice president and chief legal officer to Trump and the Trump Organization, and his advisor on Israel.

Greenblatt favors a two-state solution, reached by the parties concerned and not imposed from outside by a body such as the United Nations. Greenblatt has stated that "West Bank settlements are not an obstacle to peace".

In late December 2016, Trump named Greenblatt as his Representative for International Negotiations for his incoming administration.

Greenblatt attended the inauguration of ″Pilgrimage Road″ in the ″City of David (archaeological site)″ in the Wadi Hilweh area of the Palestinian village of Silwan, 30 June 2019

On September 5, 2019, it was announced that he would be leaving the White House.

In February 2020, Greenblatt joined OurCrowd, global venture investments platform, as a partner with the responsibilities of building ties in the Middle East.

In 2022 In the Path of Abraham: How Donald Trump Made Peace in the Middle East by Jason Greenblatt about the 2020 Israel–Palestine peace proposal was published.

== Personal life ==
Greenblatt is an Orthodox Jew, and lives in Teaneck, New Jersey, with his wife and six children, the eldest three of which are triplets. His wife, Naomi Greenblatt, is a psychiatrist.

In May 2017 Greenblatt received an honorary doctorate from Touro College in New York City.
