= Albrecht Dold =

German mathematician (1928–2011)

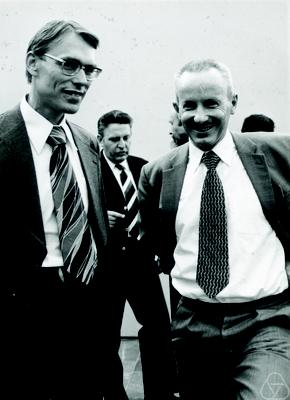
- From left: Helmut R. Salzmann, Karl Peter Grotemeyer, Albrecht Dold, June 1975 in Oberwolfach
- Born: 5 August 1928
- Died: 26 September 2011 (aged 83)
- Education: Heidelberg University
- Known for: Dold manifold Dold–Kan correspondence Dold–Thom theorem Quasi-fibration
- Scientific career
- Fields: Mathematics
- Workplaces: Heidelberg University
- Doctoral advisor: Herbert Seifert
- Doctoral students: Mónica Clapp; Eberhard Freitag

Albrecht Dold (5 August 1928 – 26 September 2011) was a German mathematician specializing in algebraic topology who proved the Dold–Thom theorem, the Dold–Kan correspondence, and introduced Dold manifolds, Dold–Puppe stabilization, and Dold fibrations.

== Life ==
Albrecht Dold was born in Triberg, and studied mathematics and physics at Heidelberg University, earning a Ph.D. degree in 1954 under the direction of Herbert Seifert. He visited the Institute for Advanced Study in Princeton in 1956–58, and taught at Columbia University in 1960–62 and at the University of Zürich in 1962–63. In 1963 he returned to Heidelberg, where he stayed most of his career, till his retirement in 1996.

Dold's work in algebraic topology, in particular, his work on fixed-point theory has made him known in economics as well as mathematics. His book "Lectures on Algebraic Topology" is a standard reference among economists as well as mathematicians. He had 19 doctoral students, including Mónica Clapp, Eberhard Freitag, Volker Puppe, and Carl-Friedrich Bödigheimer, as well as 58 descendants.

Dold was married to Yvonne Dold-Samplonius, a distinguished historian of mathematics.
