= Rational homotopy theory =

Mathematical theory of topological spaces

In mathematics and specifically in topology, rational homotopy theory is a simplified version of homotopy theory for topological spaces, in which all torsion in the homotopy groups is ignored. It was founded by Dennis Sullivan (1977) and Daniel Quillen (1969). This simplification of homotopy theory makes certain calculations much easier.

Rational homotopy types of simply connected spaces can be identified with (isomorphism classes of) certain algebraic objects called Sullivan minimal models, which are commutative differential graded algebras over the rational numbers satisfying certain conditions.

A geometric application was the theorem of Sullivan and Micheline Vigué-Poirrier (1976): every simply connected closed Riemannian manifold X whose rational cohomology ring is not generated by one element has infinitely many geometrically distinct closed geodesics. The proof used rational homotopy theory to show that the Betti numbers of the free loop space of X are unbounded. The theorem then follows from a 1969 result of Detlef Gromoll and Wolfgang Meyer.

== Rational spaces ==
A continuous map $f\colon X \to Y$ of simply connected topological spaces is called a rational homotopy equivalence if it induces an isomorphism on homotopy groups tensored with the rational numbers $\Q$. Equivalently: f is a rational homotopy equivalence if and only if it induces an isomorphism on singular homology groups with rational coefficients. The rational homotopy category (of simply connected spaces) is defined to be the localization of the category of simply connected spaces with respect to rational homotopy equivalences. The goal of rational homotopy theory is to understand this category (i.e. to determine the information that can be recovered from rational homotopy equivalences).

One basic result is that the rational homotopy category is equivalent to a full subcategory of the homotopy category of topological spaces, the subcategory of rational spaces. By definition, a rational space is a simply connected CW complex all of whose homotopy groups are vector spaces over the rational numbers. For any simply connected CW complex $X$, there is a rational space $X_{\Q}$, unique up to homotopy equivalence, with a map $X \to X_{\Q}$ that induces an isomorphism on homotopy groups tensored with the rational numbers. The space $X_{\Q}$ is called the rationalization of $X$. This is a special case of Sullivan's construction of the localization of a space at a given set of prime numbers.

One obtains equivalent definitions using homology rather than homotopy groups. Namely, a simply connected CW complex $X$ is a rational space if and only if its homology groups $H_i(X,\Z)$ are rational vector spaces for all $i > 0$. The rationalization of a simply connected CW complex $X$ is the unique rational space $X \to X_{\Q}$ (up to homotopy equivalence) with a map $X \to X_{\Q}$ that induces an isomorphism on rational homology. Thus, one has

$$\pi_i(X_{\Q})\cong \pi_i(X)\otimes {\Q}$$

and

$$H_i(X_{\Q};{\Z})\cong H_i(X;{\Z})\otimes {\Q}\cong H_i(X;{\Q})$$

for all $i>0$.

These results for simply connected spaces extend with little change to nilpotent spaces (spaces whose fundamental group is nilpotent and acts nilpotently on the higher homotopy groups). There are also several non-equivalent extensions of the notions of rational space and rationalization functor to the case of all spaces (Bousfield-Kan's $\Q$-completion, Sullivan’s rationalization, Bousfield’s homology rationalization, Casacuberta-Peschke’s $\Omega$-rationalization and Gómez-Tato-Halperin-Tanré’s $\pi_1$-fiberwise rationalization).

Computing the homotopy groups of spheres is a central open problem in homotopy theory. However, the rational homotopy groups of spheres were computed by Jean-Pierre Serre in 1951:

$$\pi_i(S^{2a-1})\otimes \Q\cong \begin{cases}
\Q &\text{if }i=2a-1\\
0 &\text{otherwise}
\end{cases}$$

and

$$\pi_i(S^{2a})\otimes \Q\cong \begin{cases}
\Q &\text{if }i=2a\text{ or }i=4a-1\\
0 &\text{otherwise.}
\end{cases}$$

This suggests the possibility of describing the whole rational homotopy category in a practically computable way. Rational homotopy theory has realized much of that goal.

In homotopy theory, spheres and Eilenberg–MacLane spaces are two very different types of basic spaces from which all spaces can be built. In rational homotopy theory, these two types of spaces become much closer. In particular, Serre's calculation implies that $S^{2a-1}_{\Q}$ is the Eilenberg–MacLane space $K(\Q,2a-1)$. More generally, let X be any space whose rational cohomology ring is a free graded-commutative algebra (a tensor product of a polynomial ring on generators of even degree and an exterior algebra on generators of odd degree). Then the rationalization $X_{\Q}$ is a product of Eilenberg–MacLane spaces. The hypothesis on the cohomology ring applies to any compact Lie group (or more generally, any loop space). For example, for the unitary group SU(n),

$$\operatorname{SU}(n)_{\Q} \simeq S^3_{\Q}\times S^5_{\Q}\times\cdots\times S^{2n-1}_{\Q}.$$

== Cohomology ring and homotopy Lie algebra ==
There are two basic invariants of a space X in the rational homotopy category: the rational cohomology ring $H^*(X,\Q)$ and the homotopy Lie algebra $\pi_*(X)\otimes \Q$. The rational cohomology is a graded-commutative algebra over $\Q$, and the homotopy groups form a graded Lie algebra via the Whitehead product. (More precisely, writing $\Omega X$ for the loop space of X, we have that $\pi_*(\Omega X)\otimes \Q$ is a graded Lie algebra over $\Q$. In view of the isomorphism $\pi_i(X) \cong \pi_{i-1}(\Omega X)$, this just amounts to a shift of the grading by 1.) For example, Serre's theorem above says that $\pi_{*}(\Omega S^n) \otimes \Q$ is the free graded Lie algebra on one generator of degree $n-1$.

Another way to think of the homotopy Lie algebra is that the homology of the loop space of X is the universal enveloping algebra of the homotopy Lie algebra:

$$H_*(\Omega X,{\Q})\cong U(\pi_*(\Omega X)\otimes \Q).$$

Conversely, one can reconstruct the rational homotopy Lie algebra from the homology of the loop space as the subspace of primitive elements in the Hopf algebra $H_{*}(\Omega S^n) \otimes \Q$.

A central result of the theory is that the rational homotopy category can be described in a purely algebraic way; in fact, in two different algebraic ways. First, Quillen showed that the rational homotopy category is equivalent to the homotopy category of connected differential graded Lie algebras. (The associated graded Lie algebra $\ker(d)/\operatorname{im}(d)$ is the homotopy Lie algebra.) Second, Quillen showed that the rational homotopy category is equivalent to the homotopy category of 1-connected differential graded cocommutative coalgebras. (The associated coalgebra is the rational homology of X as a coalgebra; the dual vector space is the rational cohomology ring.) These equivalences were among the first applications of Quillen's theory of model categories.

In particular, the second description implies that for any graded-commutative $\Q$-algebra A of the form

$$A=\Q \oplus A^2\oplus A^3 \oplus\cdots,$$

with each vector space $A^i$ of finite dimension, there is a simply connected space X whose rational cohomology ring is isomorphic to A. (By contrast, there are many restrictions, not completely understood, on the integral or mod p cohomology rings of topological spaces, for prime numbers p.) In the same spirit, Sullivan showed that any graded-commutative $\Q$-algebra with $A^1=0$ that satisfies Poincaré duality is the cohomology ring of some simply connected smooth closed manifold, except in dimension 4a; in that case, one also needs to assume that the intersection pairing on $A^{2a}$ is of the form $\sum \pm x^2_i$ over $\Q$.

One may ask how to pass between the two algebraic descriptions of the rational homotopy category. In short, a Lie algebra determines a graded-commutative algebra by Lie algebra cohomology, and an augmented commutative algebra determines a graded Lie algebra by reduced André–Quillen cohomology. More generally, there are versions of these constructions for differential graded algebras. This duality between commutative algebras and Lie algebras is a version of Koszul duality.

== Sullivan algebras ==
For spaces whose rational homology in each degree has finite dimension, Sullivan classified all rational homotopy types in terms of simpler algebraic objects, Sullivan algebras. By definition, a Sullivan algebra is a commutative differential graded algebra over the rationals $\Q$, whose underlying algebra is the free commutative graded algebra $\bigwedge(V)$ on a graded vector space

$$V=\bigoplus_{n>0}V^n,$$

satisfying the following "nilpotence condition" on its differential d: the space V is the union of an increasing series of graded subspaces, $V(0)\subseteq V(1) \subseteq \cdots$, where $d=0$ on $V(0)$ and $d(V(k))$ is contained in $\bigwedge(V(k-1))$. In the context of differential graded algebras A, "commutative" is used to mean graded-commutative; that is,

$$ab=(-1)^{ij}ba$$

for a in $A^i$ and b in $A^j$.

The Sullivan algebra is called minimal if the image of d is contained in $\bigwedge^{+}(V)^2$, where $\bigwedge^{+}(V)$ is the direct sum of the positive-degree subspaces of $\bigwedge (V)$.

A Sullivan model for a commutative differential graded algebra A is a Sullivan algebra $\bigwedge (V)$ with a homomorphism $\bigwedge (V)\to A$ which induces an isomorphism on cohomology. If $A^0=\Q$, then A has a minimal Sullivan model which is unique up to isomorphism. (Warning: a minimal Sullivan algebra with the same cohomology algebra as A need not be a minimal Sullivan model for A: it is also necessary that the isomorphism of cohomology be induced by a homomorphism of differential graded algebras. There are examples of non-isomorphic minimal Sullivan models with isomorphic cohomology algebras.)

== The Sullivan minimal model of a topological space ==
For any topological space X, Sullivan defined a commutative differential graded algebra $A_{PL}(X)$, called the algebra of polynomial differential forms on X with rational coefficients. An element of this algebra consists of (roughly) a polynomial form on each singular simplex of X, compatible with face and degeneracy maps. This algebra is usually very large (uncountable dimension) but can be replaced by a much smaller algebra. More precisely, any differential graded algebra with the same Sullivan minimal model as $A_{PL}(X)$ is called a model for the space X. When X is simply connected, such a model determines the rational homotopy type of X.

To any simply connected CW complex X with all rational homology groups of finite dimension, there is a minimal Sullivan model $\bigwedge V$ for $A_{PL}(X)$, which has the property that $V^1=0$ and all the $V^k$ have finite dimension. This is called the Sullivan minimal model of X; it is unique up to isomorphism. This gives an equivalence between rational homotopy types of such spaces and such algebras, with the properties:

- The rational cohomology of the space is the cohomology of its Sullivan minimal model.
- The spaces of indecomposables in V are the duals of the rational homotopy groups of the space X.
- The Whitehead product on rational homotopy is the dual of the "quadratic part" of the differential d.
- Two spaces have the same rational homotopy type if and only if their minimal Sullivan algebras are isomorphic.
- There is a simply connected space X corresponding to each possible Sullivan algebra with $V^1=0$ and all the $V^k$ of finite dimension.

When X is a smooth manifold, the differential algebra of smooth differential forms on X (the de Rham complex) is almost a model for X; more precisely it is the tensor product of a model for X with the reals and therefore determines the real homotopy type. One can go further and define the p-completed homotopy type of X for a prime number p. Sullivan's "arithmetic square" reduces many problems in homotopy theory to the combination of rational and p-completed homotopy theory, for all primes p.

The construction of Sullivan minimal models for simply connected spaces extends to nilpotent spaces. For more general fundamental groups, things get more complicated; for example, the rational homotopy groups of a finite CW complex (such as the wedge $S^1 \vee S^2$) can be infinite-dimensional vector spaces.

== Formal spaces ==
A commutative differential graded algebra A, again with $A^0=\Q$, is called formal if A has a model with vanishing differential. This is equivalent to requiring that the cohomology algebra of A (viewed as a differential algebra with trivial differential) is a model for A (though it does not have to be the minimal model). Thus the rational homotopy type of a formal space is completely determined by its cohomology ring.

Examples of formal spaces include spheres, H-spaces, symmetric spaces, and compact Kähler manifolds. Formality is preserved under products and wedge sums. For manifolds, formality is preserved by connected sums.

On the other hand, closed nilmanifolds are almost never formal: if M is a formal nilmanifold, then M must be the torus of some dimension. The simplest example of a non-formal nilmanifold is the Heisenberg manifold, the quotient of the Heisenberg group of real 3×3 upper triangular matrices with 1's on the diagonal by its subgroup of matrices with integral coefficients. Closed symplectic manifolds need not be formal: the simplest example is the Kodaira–Thurston manifold (the product of the Heisenberg manifold with a circle). There are also examples of non-formal, simply connected symplectic closed manifolds.

Non-formality can often be detected by Massey products. Indeed, if a differential graded algebra A is formal, then all (higher order) Massey products must vanish. The converse is not true: formality means, roughly speaking, the "uniform" vanishing of all Massey products. The complement of the Borromean rings is a non-formal space: it supports a nontrivial triple Massey product.

== Examples ==
- If X is a sphere of odd dimension $2n+1 > 1$, its minimal Sullivan model has one generator a of degree $2n+1$ with $da = 0$, and a basis of elements 1, a.
- If X is a sphere of even dimension $2n > 0$, its minimal Sullivan model has two generators a and b of degrees $2n$ and $4n-1$, with $db = a^2$, $da = 0$, and a basis of elements $1, a, b\to a^2$, $ab\to a^3$, $a^2b \to a^4, \ldots$, where the arrow indicates the action of d.
- If X is the complex projective space $\mathbb{CP}^n$ with $n > 0$, its minimal Sullivan model has two generators u and x of degrees 2 and $2n+1$, with $du = 0$ and $dx = u^{n+1}$. It has a basis of elements $1, u, u^2, \ldots ,u^n$, $x \to u^{n+1}$, $xu \to u^{n+2}, \ldots$.
- Suppose that V has 4 elements a, b, x, y of degrees 2, 3, 3 and 4 with differentials $da = 0$, $db = 0$, $dx = a^2$, $dy = ab$. Then this algebra is a minimal Sullivan algebra that is not formal. The cohomology algebra has nontrivial components only in dimension 2, 3, 6, generated respectively by a, b, and $xb-ay$. Any homomorphism from V to its cohomology algebra would map y to 0 and x to a multiple of b; so it would map $xb-ay$ to 0. So V cannot be a model for its cohomology algebra. The corresponding topological spaces are two spaces with isomorphic rational cohomology rings but different rational homotopy types. Notice that $xb-ay$ is in the Massey product $\langle [a], [a], [b] \rangle$.

== Elliptic and hyperbolic spaces ==
Rational homotopy theory revealed an unexpected dichotomy among finite CW complexes: either the rational homotopy groups are zero in sufficiently high degrees, or they grow exponentially. Namely, let X be a simply connected space such that $H_*(X,\Q)$ is a finite-dimensional $\Q$-vector space (for example, a finite CW complex has this property). Define X to be rationally elliptic if $\pi_*(X) \otimes \Q$ is also a finite-dimensional $\Q$-vector space, and otherwise rationally hyperbolic. Then Félix and Halperin showed: if X is rationally hyperbolic, then there is a real number $C > 1$ and an integer N such that

$$\sum_{i=1}^n \dim_{\Q}\pi_i(X)\otimes {\Q} \geq C^n$$

for all $n \ge N$.

For example, spheres, complex projective spaces, and homogeneous spaces for compact Lie groups are elliptic. On the other hand, "most" finite complexes are hyperbolic. For example:

- The rational cohomology ring of an elliptic space satisfies Poincaré duality.
- If X is an elliptic space whose top nonzero rational cohomology group is in degree n, then each Betti number $b_i(X)$ is at most the binomial coefficient $\binom{n}{i}$ (with equality for the n-dimensional torus).
- The Euler characteristic of an elliptic space X is nonnegative. If the Euler characteristic is positive, then all odd Betti numbers $b_{2i+1}(X)$ are zero, and the rational cohomology ring of X is a complete intersection ring.

There are many other restrictions on the rational cohomology ring of an elliptic space.

Bott's conjecture predicts that every simply connected closed Riemannian manifold with nonnegative sectional curvature should be rationally elliptic. Very little is known about the conjecture, although it holds for all known examples of such manifolds.

Halperin's conjecture asserts that the rational Serre spectral sequence of a fiber sequence of simply-connected spaces with rationally elliptic fiber of non-zero Euler characteristic vanishes at the second page.

A simply connected finite complex X is rationally elliptic if and only if the rational homology of the loop space $\Omega X$ grows at most polynomially. More generally, X is called integrally elliptic if the mod p homology of $\Omega X$ grows at most polynomially, for every prime number p. All known Riemannian manifolds with nonnegative sectional curvature are in fact integrally elliptic.

== See also ==
- Mandell's theorem – analogue of rational homotopy theory in p-adic settings
- Chromatic homotopy theory
