= A∞-operad =

In mathematics, an A_{∞}-operad is a type of operad used in algebraic topology and homotopy theory to describe algebraic structures where the property of associativity is loosened. In a simple associative operation, such as the multiplication of numbers, the order of operations does not matter: $(a \times b) \times c = a \times (b \times c)$. An algebraic structure governed by an A_{∞}-operad is one where this equality is not strict, but the two sides are connected by a homotopy (a continuous path or transformation). The operad itself provides the formal structure for these paths and for higher-level paths that ensure all possible ways of regrouping are compatible with each other.

More formally, an A_{∞}-operad is a parameter space for a multiplication map that is homotopy coherently associative. The "A" stands for "associative", and the infinity symbol "∞" indicates that the associativity holds up to an infinite hierarchy of higher homotopies. This concept is fundamental to the study of loop spaces and is a key tool in fields like symplectic geometry (through the Fukaya category). (An operad that describes a multiplication that is both homotopy coherently associative and homotopy coherently commutative is called an E_{∞}-operad.)

== Definition ==
In the (usual) setting of operads with an action of the symmetric group on topological spaces, an operad A is said to be an A_{∞}-operad if all of its spaces A(n) are Σ_{n}-equivariantly homotopy equivalent to the discrete spaces Σ_{n} (the symmetric group) with its multiplication action (where n ∈ N). In the setting of non-Σ operads (also termed nonsymmetric operads, operads without permutation), an operad A is A_{∞} if all of its spaces A(n) are contractible. In other categories than topological spaces, the notions of homotopy and contractibility have to be replaced by suitable analogs, such as homology equivalences in the category of chain complexes.

== A_{n}-operads ==
The letter A in the terminology stands for "associative", and the infinity symbols says that associativity is required up to "all" higher homotopies. More generally, there is a weaker notion of A_{n}-operad (n ∈ N), parametrizing multiplications that are associative only up to a certain level of homotopies. In particular,

- A_{1}-spaces are pointed spaces;
- A_{2}-spaces are H-spaces with no associativity conditions; and
- A_{3}-spaces are homotopy associative H-spaces.

== A_{∞}-operads and single loop spaces ==
A space X is the loop space of some other space, denoted by BX, if and only if X is an algebra over an $A_{\infty}$-operad and the monoid π_{0}(X) of its connected components is a group. An algebra over an $A_{\infty}$-operad is referred to as an $\mathbf{A}_{\infty}$-space. There are three consequences of this characterization of loop spaces. First, a loop space is an $A_{\infty}$-space. Second, a connected $A_{\infty}$-space X is a loop space. Third, the group completion of a possibly disconnected $A_{\infty}$-space is a loop space.

The importance of $A_{\infty}$-operads in homotopy theory stems from this relationship between algebras over $A_{\infty}$-operads and loop spaces.

== A_{∞}-algebras ==
An algebra over the $A_{\infty}$-operad is called an $A_{\infty}$-algebra. Examples feature the Fukaya category of a symplectic manifold, when it can be defined (see also pseudoholomorphic curve).

== Examples ==
The most obvious, if not particularly useful, example of an $A_{\infty}$-operad is the associative operad a given by $a(n) = \Sigma_n$. This operad describes strictly associative multiplications. By definition, any other $A_{\infty}$-operad has a map to a which is a homotopy equivalence.

A geometric example of an A_{∞}-operad is given by the Stasheff polytopes or associahedra.

A less combinatorial example is the operad of little intervals: The space $A(n)$ consists of all embeddings of n disjoint intervals into the unit interval.

== See also ==
- Homotopy associative algebra
- operad
- E-infinity operad
- loop space
