= Robert Thomason =

Robert Thomason may refer to:

- R. Ewing Thomason (1879–1973), politician
- Robert Wayne Thomason (1952–1995), mathematician
