= En-ring =

Symmetric monoidal infinity category

In mathematics, an $\mathcal{E}_n$-algebra in a symmetric monoidal infinity category C consists of the following data:

- An object $A(U)$ for any open subset U of R^{n} homeomorphic to an n-disk.
- A multiplication map:
  $$\mu: A(U_1) \otimes \cdots \otimes A(U_m) \to A(V)$$

for any disjoint open disks $U_j$ contained in some open disk V

subject to the requirements that the multiplication maps are compatible with composition, and that $\mu$ is an equivalence if $m=1$. An equivalent definition is that A is an algebra in C over the little n-disks operad.

== Examples ==
- An $\mathcal{E}_n$-algebra in vector spaces over a field is a unital associative algebra if n = 1, and a unital commutative associative algebra if n ≥ 2.
- An $\mathcal{E}_n$-algebra in categories is a monoidal category if n = 1, a braided monoidal category if n = 2, and a symmetric monoidal category if n ≥ 3.
- If Λ is a commutative ring, then $X \mapsto C_*(\Omega^n X; \Lambda)$ defines an $\mathcal{E}_n$-algebra in the infinity category of chain complexes of $\Lambda$-modules.

== See also ==
- Categorical ring
- Highly structured ring spectrum
