= Dennis Sullivan =

American mathematician (born 1941)

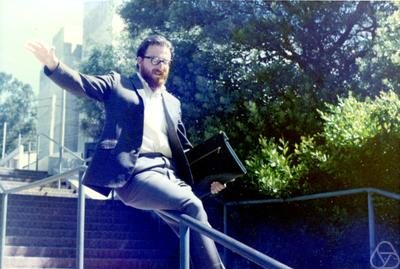
- Sullivan in 1968
- Born: Dennis Parnell Sullivan; February 12, 1941 (age 85); Port Huron, Michigan, U.S.
- Education: Rice University (BA); Princeton University (MA, PhD)
- Known for: Connes–Donaldson–Sullivan–Teleman index theorem; Parry–Sullivan invariant; Sullivan conjecture; Density conjecture; Localization of a topological space; No-wandering-domain theorem; Rational homotopy theory; String topology
- Awards: Oswald Veblen Prize in Geometry (1971); National Medal of Science (2004); Leroy P. Steele Prize (2006); Wolf Prize (2010); Balzan Prize (2014); Abel Prize (2022)
- Scientific career
- Fields: Topology
- Workplaces: Stony Brook University; City University of New York
- Thesis: Triangulating Homotopy Equivalences (1966)
- Doctoral advisor: William Browder
- Doctoral students: Harold Abelson; Curtis T. McMullen; Manuel Rivera

Dennis Parnell Sullivan (born February 12, 1941) is an American mathematician known for his work in algebraic topology, geometric topology, and dynamical systems. He holds the Albert Einstein Chair at the Graduate Center of the City University of New York and is a distinguished professor at Stony Brook University.

Sullivan was awarded the Wolf Prize in Mathematics in 2010 and the Abel Prize in 2022.

== Early life and education ==
Sullivan was born in Port Huron, Michigan, on February 12, 1941. His family moved to Houston soon afterwards.

He entered Rice University to study chemical engineering but switched his major to mathematics in his second year after encountering a particularly motivating mathematical theorem. The change was prompted by a special case of the uniformization theorem, according to which, in his own words:

[A]ny surface topologically like a balloon, and no matter what shape—a banana or the statue of David by Michelangelo—could be placed on to a perfectly round sphere so that the stretching or squeezing required at each and every point is the same in all directions at each such point.

He received his Bachelor of Arts degree from Rice University in 1963. He obtained his Doctor of Philosophy from Princeton University in 1966 with his thesis, Triangulating homotopy equivalences, under the supervision of William Browder.

== Career ==
Sullivan worked at the University of Warwick on a NATO Fellowship from 1966 to 1967. He was a Miller Research Fellow at the University of California, Berkeley from 1967 to 1969 and then a Sloan Fellow at Massachusetts Institute of Technology from 1969 to 1973. He was a visiting scholar at the Institute for Advanced Study in 1967–1968, 1968–1970, and again in 1975.

Sullivan was an associate professor at Paris-Sud University from 1973 to 1974, and then became a permanent professor at the Institut des Hautes Études Scientifiques (IHÉS) in 1974. In 1981, he became the Albert Einstein Chair in Science (Mathematics) at the Graduate Center of the City University of New York and reduced his duties at the IHÉS to a half-time appointment. He joined the mathematics faculty at Stony Brook University in 1996 and left the IHÉS the following year.

Sullivan was involved in the founding of the Simons Center for Geometry and Physics and is a member of its board of trustees.

== Research ==
=== Topology ===
==== Geometric topology ====
Along with Browder and his other students, Sullivan was an early adopter of surgery theory, particularly for classifying high-dimensional manifolds. His thesis work was focused on the Hauptvermutung.

In an influential set of notes in 1970, Sullivan put forward the radical concept that, within homotopy theory, spaces could directly "be broken into boxes" (or localized), a procedure hitherto applied to the algebraic constructs made from them.

The Sullivan conjecture, proved in its original form by Haynes Miller, states that the classifying space BG of a finite group G is sufficiently different from any finite CW complex X, that it maps to such an X only 'with difficulty'; in a more formal statement, the space of all mappings BG to X, as pointed spaces and given the compact-open topology, is weakly contractible. Sullivan's conjecture was also first presented in his 1970 notes.

Sullivan and Daniel Quillen (independently) created rational homotopy theory in the late 1960s and 1970s. It examines "rationalizations" of simply connected topological spaces with homotopy groups and singular homology groups tensored with the rational numbers, ignoring torsion elements and simplifying certain calculations.

==== Kleinian groups ====
Sullivan and William Thurston generalized Lipman Bers' density conjecture from singly degenerate Kleinian surface groups to all finitely generated Kleinian groups in the late 1970s and early 1980s. The conjecture states that every finitely generated Kleinian group is an algebraic limit of geometrically finite Kleinian groups, and was independently proven by Ohshika and Namazi–Souto in 2011 and 2012 respectively.

==== Conformal and quasiconformal mappings ====
The Connes–Donaldson–Sullivan–Teleman index theorem is an extension of the Atiyah–Singer index theorem to quasiconformal manifolds due to a joint paper by Simon Donaldson and Sullivan in 1989 and a joint paper by Alain Connes, Sullivan, and Nicolae Teleman in 1994.

In 1987, Sullivan and Burton Rodin proved Thurston's conjecture about the approximation of the Riemann map by circle packings.

==== String topology ====
Sullivan and Moira Chas started the field of string topology, which examines algebraic structures on the homology of free loop spaces. They developed the Chas–Sullivan product to give a partial singular homology analogue of the cup product from singular cohomology. String topology has been used in multiple proposals to construct topological quantum field theories in mathematical physics.

=== Dynamical systems ===
In 1975, Sullivan and Bill Parry introduced the topological Parry–Sullivan invariant for flows in one-dimensional dynamical systems.

In 1985, Sullivan proved the no-wandering-domain theorem. This result was described by mathematician Anthony Philips as leading to a "revival of holomorphic dynamics after 60 years of stagnation."

== Awards and honors ==
- 1971 Oswald Veblen Prize in Geometry
- 1981 Prix Élie Cartan, French Academy of Sciences
- 1983 Member, National Academy of Sciences
- 1991 Member, American Academy of Arts and Sciences
- 1994 King Faisal International Prize for Science
- 2004 National Medal of Science
- 2006 Steele Prize for lifetime achievement
- 2010 Wolf Prize in Mathematics, for "his contributions to algebraic topology and conformal dynamics"
- 2012 Fellow of the American Mathematical Society
- 2014 Balzan Prize in Mathematics (pure or applied)
- 2022 Abel Prize

== Personal life ==
Sullivan is married to fellow mathematician Moira Chas.

== See also ==
- Assembly map
- Double bubble conjecture
- Flexible polyhedron
- Formal manifold
- Loch Ness monster surface
- Normal invariant
- Ring lemma
- Rummler–Sullivan theorem
- Ruziewicz problem
