= E∞ =

E_{∞} or E-infinity may refer to:

- E-infinity ring, a commutative ring construct in homotopy theory
- E_{∞}-operad, a set of contractible maps that are commutative and associative
- E-infinity theory, a fringe fractal cosmology proposed by Mohamed El Naschie
