= Pontryagin product =

Mathematical product in topology

In mathematics, the Pontryagin product, introduced by Lev Pontryagin (1939), is a product on the homology of a topological space induced by a product on the topological space. Special cases include the Pontryagin product on the homology of an abelian group, the Pontryagin product on an H-space, and the Pontryagin product on a loop space.

== Cross product ==
In order to define the Pontryagin product we first need a map which sends the direct product of the m-th and n-th homology group to the (m+n)-th homology group of a space. We therefore define the cross product, starting on the level of singular chains. Given two topological spaces X and Y and two singular simplices $f:\Delta^m\to X$ and $g:\Delta^n\to Y$ we can define the product map $f\times g:\Delta^m\times\Delta^n\to X\times Y$, the only difficulty is showing that this defines a singular (m+n)-simplex in $X\times Y$. To do this one can subdivide $\Delta^m\times\Delta^n$ into (m+n)-simplices. It is then easy to show that this map induces a map on homology of the form

$$H_m(X;R)\otimes H_n(Y;R)\to H_{m+n}(X\times Y;R)$$

by proving that if $f$ and $g$ are cycles then so is $f\times g$ and if either $f$ or $g$ is a boundary then so is the product.

== Definition ==
Given an H-space $X$ with multiplication $\mu:X\times X\to X$, the Pontryagin product on homology is defined by the following composition of maps

$$H_*(X;R)\otimes H_*(X;R)\xrightarrow[]{\times} H_*(X\times X;R) \xrightarrow[]{\mu_*} H_*(X;R)$$

where the first map is the cross product defined above and the second map is given by the multiplication $X\times X\to X$ of the H-space followed by application of the homology functor to obtain a homomorphism on the level of homology. Then $H_*(X;R) = \bigoplus_{n=0}^\infty H_n(X;R)$.
