= Nilpotent space =

In topology, a branch of mathematics, a nilpotent space, first defined by Emmanuel Dror Farjoun (1969), is a based topological space $X$ such that

- the fundamental group $\pi = \pi_1 (X)$ is a nilpotent group;
- $\pi$ acts nilpotently on the higher homotopy groups $\pi_i (X), i \ge 2$, i.e., there is a central series $\pi_i (X) = G^i_1 \triangleright G^i_2 \triangleright \dots \triangleright G^i_{n_i} = 1$ such that the induced action of $\pi$ on the quotient group $G^i_k/G^i_{k+1}$ is trivial for all $k$.

Simply connected spaces and simple spaces are (trivial) examples of nilpotent spaces; other examples are connected loop spaces. The homotopy fiber of any map between nilpotent spaces is a disjoint union of nilpotent spaces. Moreover, the null component of the pointed mapping space $\operatorname{Map}_*(K,X)$, where $K$ is a pointed, finite-dimensional CW complex and $X$ is any pointed space, is a nilpotent space. The odd-dimensional real projective spaces are nilpotent spaces, while the projective plane is not.

A basic theorem about nilpotent spaces states that any map that induces an integral homology isomorphism between two nilpotent space is a weak homotopy equivalence. For simply connected spaces, this theorem recovers a well-known corollary to the Whitehead and Hurewicz theorems.

Nilpotent spaces are of great interest in rational homotopy theory, because most constructions applicable to simply connected spaces can be extended to nilpotent spaces. The Bousfield–Kan nilpotent completion of a space associates with any connected pointed space $X$ a universal space $\widehat{X}$ through which any map of $X$ to a nilpotent space $N$ factors uniquely up to a contractible space of choices. Often, however, $\widehat{X}$ itself is not nilpotent but only an inverse limit of a tower of nilpotent spaces. This tower, as a pro-space, always models the homology type of the given pointed space $X$. Hence, the Bousfield-Kan completion of a space is in precise sense the nilpotent completion of that space, with respect to a given ring. The Bousfield-Kan completion tower of any connected pointed space ${X}$, is a tower of nilpotent spaces which has the same (R-) pro-homology as the give space ${X}$.

Nilpotent spaces admit a good arithmetic localization theory in the sense of Bousfield and Kan cited above, and the unstable Adams spectral sequence strongly converges for any such space. Nilpotent spaces admit splitting by the so called arithmetic square that present any nilpotent space as a homotopy pull-back of rational and p-adic localizations.

Nilpotent spaces appear naturally as spaces of automorphism of finite dimensional spaces. Let ${aut_I{X}}$ be the space of pointed homotopy self-equivalence of a finite dimensional ${K}$, that induces identity on the homotopy groups up to the dimension of ${K}$. Then the classifying space $Baut_I{K}$ is a nilpotent space.

Let $X$ be a nilpotent space and let $h$ be a reduced generalized homology theory, such as K-theory. If $h(X)=0$, then $h$ vanishes on any Postnikov section of $X$. This follows from a theorem that states that any such section is $X$-cellular. It is known that any cellularization functor $cell_A X$ of a truncated nilpotent space is a truncated nilpotent space. But it is conjectured by E.D. Farjoun that the same is true for any localization $L_f X$ of a truncated nilpotent space $X=X_{<n}$.
