= String topology =

Branch of topology

String topology, a branch of mathematics, is the study of algebraic structures on the homology of free loop spaces. The field was started by Moira Chas and Dennis Sullivan (1999).

== Motivation ==
While the singular cohomology of a space has always a product structure, this is not true for the singular homology of a space. Nevertheless, it is possible to construct such a structure for an oriented manifold $M$ of dimension $d$. This is the so-called intersection product. Intuitively, one can describe it as follows: given classes $x\in H_p(M)$ and $y\in H_q(M)$, take their product $x\times y \in H_{p+q}(M\times M)$ and make it transversal to the diagonal $M\hookrightarrow M\times M$. The intersection is then a class in $H_{p+q-d}(M)$, the intersection product of $x$ and $y$. One way to make this construction rigorous is to use stratifolds.

Another case, where the homology of a space has a product, is the (based) loop space $\Omega X$ of a space $X$. Here the space itself has a product

$$m\colon \Omega X\times \Omega X \to \Omega X$$

by going first through the first loop and then through the second one. There is no analogous product structure for the free loop space $LX$ of all maps from $S^1$ to $X$ since the two loops need not have a common point. A substitute for the map $m$ is the map

$$\gamma\colon {\rm Map}(S^1 \lor S^1, M)\to LM$$

where ${\rm Map}(S^1 \lor S^1, M)$ is the subspace of $LM\times LM$, where the value of the two loops coincides at 0 and $\gamma$ is defined again by composing the loops.

== The Chas–Sullivan product ==
The idea of the Chas–Sullivan product is to now combine the product structures above. Consider two classes $x\in H_p(LM)$ and $y\in H_q(LM)$. Their product $x\times y$ lies in $H_{p+q}(LM\times LM)$. We need a map

$$i^!\colon H_{p+q}(LM\times LM)\to H_{p+q-d}({\rm Map}(S^1 \lor S^1,M)).$$

One way to construct this is to use stratifolds (or another geometric definition of homology) to do transversal intersection (after interpreting ${\rm Map}(S^1 \lor S^1, M) \subset LM\times LM$ as an inclusion of Hilbert manifolds). Another approach starts with the collapse map from $LM\times LM$ to the Thom space of the normal bundle of ${\rm Map}(S^1 \lor S^1, M)$. Composing the induced map in homology with the Thom isomorphism, we get the map we want.

Now we can compose $i^!$ with the induced map of $\gamma$ to get a class in $H_{p+q-d}(LM)$, the Chas–Sullivan product of $x$ and $y$ (see e.g. Cohen & Jones (2002)).

== Remarks ==
- As in the case of the intersection product, there are different sign conventions concerning the Chas–Sullivan product. In some convention, it is graded commutative, in some it is not.
- The same construction works if we replace $H$ by another multiplicative homology theory $h$ if $M$ is oriented with respect to $h$.
- Furthermore, we can replace $LM$ by $L^n M = {\rm Map}(S^n, M)$. By an easy variation of the above construction, we get that $\mathcal{}h_*({\rm Map}(N,M))$ is a module over $\mathcal{}h_*L^n M$ if $N$ is a manifold of dimensions $n$.
- The Serre spectral sequence is compatible with the above algebraic structures for both the fiber bundle ${\rm ev}\colon LM\to M$ with fiber $\Omega M$ and the fiber bundle $LE\to LB$ for a fiber bundle $E\to B$, which is important for computations (see Cohen, Jones & Yan (2004) and Meier (2010)).

== The Batalin–Vilkovisky structure ==
There is an action $S^1\times LM \to LM$ by rotation, which induces a map

$$H_*(S^1)\otimes H_*(LM) \to H_*(LM)$$.

Plugging in the fundamental class $[S^1]\in H_1(S^1)$, gives an operator

$$\Delta\colon H_*(LM)\to H_{*+1}(LM)$$

of degree 1. One can show that this operator interacts nicely with the Chas–Sullivan product in the sense that they form together the structure of a Batalin–Vilkovisky algebra on $\mathcal{}H_*(LM)$. This operator tends to be difficult to compute in general. The defining identities of a Batalin-Vilkovisky algebra were checked in the original paper "by pictures." A less direct, but arguably more conceptual way to do that could be by using an action of a cactus operad on the free loop space $LM$. The cactus operad is weakly equivalent to the framed little disks operad and its action on a topological space implies a Batalin-Vilkovisky structure on homology.

== Field theories ==
The pair of pants

There are several attempts to construct (topological) field theories via string topology. The basic idea is to fix an oriented manifold $M$ and associate to every surface with $p$ incoming and $q$ outgoing boundary components (with $n\geq 1$) an operation

$$H_*(LM)^{\otimes p} \to H_*(LM)^{\otimes q}$$

which fulfills the usual axioms for a topological field theory. The Chas–Sullivan product is associated to the pair of pants. It can be shown that these operations are 0 if the genus of the surface is greater than 0 (Tamanoi (2010)).
