= BGG correspondence =

Example of the Koszul duality

In mathematics, the Bernstein-Gelfand-Gelfand correspondence or BGG correspondence for short is the first example of the Koszul duality.

Established by Joseph Bernstein, Israel Gelfand, and Sergei Gelfand, the correspondence is an explicit triangulated equivalence that relates the bounded derived category of coherent sheaves on the projective space $\mathbb{P}(V)$ and the stable category of graded modules $\operatorname{gr} \wedge V$ over the exterior algebra $\wedge V$; i.e.,

$$D^b(\mathbb{P}(V)) \simeq \overline{\operatorname{gr} \wedge V}$$.

In the noncommutative setting, Martínez Villa and Saorín generalized the BGG correspondence to finite-dimensional self-injective Koszul algebras $A$ with coherent Koszul duals $A^{!}$. Roughly speaking, they proved that the stable category of finite-dimensional graded modules over a finite-dimensional self-injective Koszul algebra $A$ is triangulated equivalent to the bounded derived category of the tails category of the Koszul dual $A^{!}$ (when $A^{!}$ is coherent).
