= Alexander A. Voronov =

Russian-American mathematician

- Александр Александрович Воронов
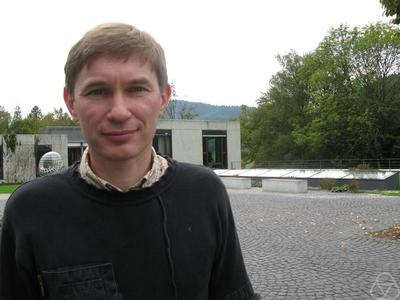
- Alexander A. Voronov in 2010
- Born: November 25, 1962 (age 63)
- Education: Moscow State School 57; Moscow State University
- Scientific career
- Workplaces: University of Minnesota; Kavli Institute for the Physics and Mathematics of the Universe

Alexander A. Voronov (Russian: Александр Александрович Воронов) (born November 25, 1962) is a Russian-American mathematician specializing in mathematical physics, algebraic topology, and algebraic geometry. He is a Professor of Mathematics at the University of Minnesota and a Visiting Senior Scientist at the Kavli Institute for the Physics and Mathematics of the Universe.

== Biography ==
Voronov graduated from Moscow State School 57 in 1980. He received an M.S. in Mathematics in 1985 and a Ph.D. in Mathematics at Moscow State University in 1988 under Yuri I. Manin. Alexander Voronov is known for his work on the super Mumford isomorphism (see Mumford measure), semi-infinite cohomology, operads in quantum field theory (see Swiss-cheese operad), Deligne's and Kontsevich's conjectures on Hochschild cohomology, cohomology of vertex operator algebras, and string topology (see cactus operad). He is a Fellow of the American Mathematical Society, an AMS Centennial Fellow,, a Simons Fellow, and a 2010 Japan Society for the Promotion of Science (JSPS) Research Fellow.

== Selected publications ==
- Voronov, A. A. (1988). "A formula for Mumford measure in superstring theory". Функциональный анализ и его приложения [Functional Anal. Appl.]. 22 (2): 139–140.
- Rosly, A. A.; Schwarz, A. S.; Voronov, A. A. (1989). "Geometry of superconformal manifolds". Comm. Math. Phys. 119 (1): 129–152. doi:10.1007/BF01218264. S2CID 120761645.
- Voronov, A. A. (1993). "Semi-infinite homological algebra". Invent. Math. 113 (1): 103–146. Bibcode:1993InMat.113..103V. doi:10.1007/BF01244304. S2CID 122758764.
- Gerstenhaber, M.; Voronov, A. A. (1995). "Homotopy G-algebras and moduli space operad". Int. Math. Res. Not. 1995 (3): 141–153. arXiv:hep-th/9409063. doi:10.1155/S1073792895000110.
- Kimura, T.; Stasheff, J.; Voronov, A. A. (1995). "On operad structures of moduli spaces and string theory". Comm. Math. Phys. 171 (1): 1–25. arXiv:hep-th/9307114. Bibcode:1995CMaPh.171....1K. doi:10.1007/BF02103769. S2CID 17765612.
- Voronov, A. A. (1999). "The Swiss-cheese operad". Homotopy invariant algebraic structures (Baltimore, MD, 1998). Contemp. Math. Vol. 239. Providence: AMS. pp. 365–373.
- Bakalov, B.; Kac, V. G.; Voronov, A. A. (1999). "Cohomology of conformal algebras". Comm. Math. Phys. 200 (3): 561–598. arXiv:math/9803022. Bibcode:1999CMaPh.200..561B. doi:10.1007/s002200050541. S2CID 15848034.
- Voronov, A. A. (2000). "Homotopy Gerstenhaber algebras". Conférence Moshé Flato 1999, Vol. II (Dijon). Math. Phys. Stud. Vol. 22. The Netherlands: Kluwer Academic Publishers. pp. 307–331.
- Voronov, A. A. (2005). "Notes on universal algebra". Graphs and patterns in mathematics and theoretical physics. Proc. Sympos. Pure Math. Vol. 73. Providence: AMS. pp. 81–103.
- Hu, P.; Kriz, I.; Voronov, A. A. (2006). "On Kontsevich's Hochschild cohomology conjecture" (PDF). Compositio Mathematica. 142 (1): 143–168. arXiv:math/0309369. doi:10.1112/S0010437X05001521. S2CID 15153116.
- Cohen, R. L.; Hess, K.; Voronov, A. A. (2006). String topology and cyclic homology. Advanced Courses in Mathematics. CRM Barcelona. Basel: Birkhäuser. pp. viii+163. ISBN 978-3-7643-7388-7.
