= Leibniz algebra =

In mathematics, a (right) Leibniz algebra, named after Gottfried Wilhelm Leibniz, sometimes called a Loday algebra, after Jean-Louis Loday, is a module L over a commutative ring R with a bilinear product [ _ , _ ] satisfying the Leibniz identity
$$[[a,b],c] = [a,[b,c]]+  [[a,c],b]. \,$$

In other words, right multiplication by any element c is a derivation. If in addition the bracket is alternating ([a, a] = 0) then the Leibniz algebra is a Lie algebra. Indeed, in this case [a, b] = −[b, a] and the Leibniz identity is equivalent to Jacobi's identity ([a, [b, c]] + [c, [a, b]] + [b, [c, a]] = 0). Conversely any Lie algebra is obviously a Leibniz algebra.

In this sense, Leibniz algebras can be seen as a non-commutative generalization of Lie algebras. The investigation of which theorems and properties of Lie algebras are still valid for Leibniz algebras is a recurrent theme in the literature. For instance, it has been shown that Engel's theorem still holds for Leibniz algebras and that a weaker version of the Levi–Malcev theorem also holds.

The tensor module, $T(V)=\bigoplus_{i=1}^\infty V^{\otimes i}$, of any vector space V can be turned into a Loday algebra such that
$$[a_1\otimes \cdots \otimes a_n,x]=a_1\otimes \cdots\otimes a_n\otimes x\quad \text{for }a_1,\ldots, a_n,x\in V.$$

This is the free Loday algebra over V.

Leibniz algebras were discovered in 1965 by A. Bloh, who called them D-algebras. They attracted interest after Jean-Louis Loday noticed that the classical Chevalley–Eilenberg boundary map in the exterior module of a Lie algebra can be lifted to the tensor module which yields a new chain complex. In fact this complex is well-defined for any Leibniz algebra. The homology HL(L) of this chain complex is known as Leibniz homology. If L is the Lie algebra of (infinite) matrices over an associative R-algebra A then the Leibniz homology of L is the tensor algebra over the Hochschild homology of A.

A Zinbiel algebra is the Koszul dual concept to a Leibniz algebra. It has as defining identity:

$$( a \circ b ) \circ c = a \circ (b \circ c) + a \circ (c \circ b) .$$

== See also ==
- Digroup, an algebraic structure inspired by a question about Leibniz algebras
