= Lie operad =

In mathematics, the Lie operad is an operad whose algebras are Lie algebras. The notion (at least one version) was introduced by Ginzburg & Kapranov (1994) in their formulation of Koszul duality.

== Definition à la Ginzburg–Kapranov ==
Fix a base field k and let $\mathcal{Lie}(x_1, \dots, x_n)$ denote the free Lie algebra over k with generators $x_1, \dots, x_n$ and $\mathcal{Lie}(n) \subset \mathcal{Lie}(x_1, \dots, x_n)$ the subspace spanned by all the bracket monomials containing each $x_i$ exactly once. The symmetric group $S_n$ acts on $\mathcal{Lie}(x_1, \dots, x_n)$ by permutations of the generators and, under that action, $\mathcal{Lie}(n)$ is invariant. The operadic composition is given by substituting expressions (with renumbered variables) for variables. Then, $\mathcal{Lie} = \{ \mathcal{Lie}(n) \}$ is an operad.

== Koszul-Dual ==
The Koszul-dual of $\mathcal{Lie}$ is the commutative-ring operad, an operad whose algebras are the commutative rings over k.
