= Multicategory =

Generalization of the concept of category that allows morphisms of multiple arity

In mathematics (especially category theory), a multicategory is a generalization of the concept of category that allows morphisms of multiple arity. If morphisms in a category are viewed as analogous to functions, then morphisms in a multicategory are analogous to functions of several variables. Multicategories are also sometimes called operads, or colored operads.

== Definition ==
A (non-symmetric) multicategory consists of

- a collection (often a proper class) of objects;
- for every finite sequence $(X_i)_{i \in [n]}$ of objects ($[n] = \{0,1,2,...,n\}$) and every object Y, a set of morphisms from $(X_i)_{i \in n}$ to Y; and
- for every object X, a special identity morphism (with n = 1) from X to X.

Additionally, there are composition operations: Given a sequence of sequences $((X_{ij})_{i \in n_j})_{j \in m}$ of objects, a sequence $(Y_j)_{j \in m}$ of objects, and an object Z: if

- for each $j \in m$, f_{j} is a morphism from $(X_{ij})_{i \in n_j}$ to Y_{j}; and
- g is a morphism from $(Y_j)_{j \in m}$ to Z:

then there is a composite morphism $g(f_j)_{j \in m}$ from $(X_{ij})_{i \in n_j, j \in m}$ to Z. This must satisfy certain axioms:

- If m = 1, Z = Y_{0}, and g is the identity morphism for Y_{0}, then g(f_{0}) = f_{0};
- if for each $j \in m$, n_{j} = 1, $X_{0j} = Y_j$, and f_{j} is the identity morphism for Y_{j}, then $g(f_j)_{j \in m} = g$; and
- an associativity condition: if for each $j \in m$ and $i \in n_j$, $e_{ij}$ is a morphism from $(W_{hij})_{h \in o_{ij}}$ to $X_{ij}$, then $g\left(f_j(e_{ij})_{i \in n_j}\right)_{j \in m} = g(f_j)_{j \in m}(e_{ij})_{i \in n_j, j \in m}$ are identical morphisms from $(W_{hij})_{h \in o_{ij}, i \in n_j, j \in m}$ to Z.

== Comcategories ==
A comcategory (co-multicategory) is a totally ordered set O of objects, a set A of multiarrows with two functions

$\mathrm{head}:A\rightarrow O,$

$\mathrm{ground}:A\rightarrow O^\%,$

where O^{%} is the set of all finite ordered sequences of elements of O. The dual image of a multiarrow f may be summarized

$f:\mathrm{head}(f) \Leftarrow \mathrm{ground}(f).$

A comcategory C also has a multiproduct with the usual character of a composition operation. C is said to be associative if there holds a multiproduct axiom in relation to this operator.

Any multicategory, symmetric or non-symmetric, together with a total-ordering of the object set, can be made into an equivalent comcategory.

A multiorder is a comcategory satisfying the following conditions.

- There is at most one multiarrow with given head and ground.
- Each object x has a unit multiarrow.
- A multiarrow is a unit if its ground has one entry.

Multiorders are a generalization of partial orders (posets), and were first introduced (in passing) by Tom Leinster.

== Examples ==
There is a multicategory whose objects are (small) sets, where a morphism from the sets X_{1}, X_{2}, ..., and X_{n} to the set Y is an n-ary function, that is a function from the Cartesian product X_{1} × X_{2} × ... × X_{n} to Y.

There is a multicategory whose objects are vector spaces (over the rational numbers, say), where a morphism from the vector spaces X_{1}, X_{2}, ..., and X_{n} to the vector space Y is a multilinear operator, that is a linear transformation from the tensor product X_{1} ⊗ X_{2} ⊗ ... ⊗ X_{n} to Y.

More generally, given any monoidal category C, there is a multicategory whose objects are objects of C, where a morphism from the C-objects X_{1}, X_{2}, ..., and X_{n} to the C-object Y is a C-morphism from the monoidal product of X_{1}, X_{2}, ..., and X_{n} to Y.

An operad is a multicategory with one unique object; except in degenerate cases, such a multicategory does not come from a monoidal category.

Examples of multiorders include pointed multisets (sequence A262671 in the OEIS), integer partitions (sequence A063834 in the OEIS), and combinatory separations (sequence A269134 in the OEIS). The triangles (or compositions) of any multiorder are morphisms of a (not necessarily associative) category of contractions and a comcategory of decompositions. The contraction category for the multiorder of multimin partitions (sequence A255397 in the OEIS) is the simplest known category of multisets.

== Applications ==
Multicategories are often incorrectly considered to belong to higher category theory, as their original application was the observation that the operators and identities satisfied by higher categories are the objects and multiarrows of a multicategory. The study of n-categories was in turn motivated by applications in algebraic topology and attempts to describe the homotopy theory of higher-dimensional manifolds.

The correspondence between contractions and decompositions of triangles in a multiorder allows one to construct an associative algebra called its incidence algebra. Any element that is nonzero on all unit arrows has a compositional inverse, and the Möbius function of a multiorder is defined as the compositional inverse of the zeta function (constant-one) in its incidence algebra.

== History ==
Multicategories were first introduced under that name by Jim Lambek in "Deductive systems and categories II" (1969). He mentions (p. 108) that he was "told that multicategories have also been studied by [Jean] Benabou and [Pierre] Cartier", and indeed Leinster opines that "the idea might have occurred to anyone who knew what both a category and a multilinear map were".

== See also ==
- pseudo-tensor category
