= H-object =

In mathematics, specifically homotopical algebra, an H-object is a categorical generalization of an H-space, which can be defined in any category $\mathcal{C}$ with a product $\times$ and an initial object $*$. These are useful constructions because they help export some of the ideas from algebraic topology and homotopy theory into other domains, such as in commutative algebra and algebraic geometry.

== Definition ==
In a category $\mathcal{C}$ with a product $\times$ and initial object $*$, an H-object is an object $X \in \text{Ob}(\mathcal{C})$ together with an operation called multiplication together with a two sided identity. If we denote $u_X: X \to *$, the structure of an H-object implies there are maps

$$\begin{align}
\varepsilon&: * \to X \\
\mu&: X\times X \to X
\end{align}$$

which have the commutation relations

$\mu(\varepsilon\circ u_X, id_X) = \mu(id_X,\varepsilon\circ u_X) = id_X$

== Examples ==
=== Magmas ===
All magmas with units are H-objects in the category $\textbf{Set}$.

=== H-spaces ===
Another example of H-objects are H-spaces in the homotopy category of topological spaces $\text{Ho}(\textbf{Top})$.

=== H-objects in homotopical algebra ===
In homotopical algebra, one class of H-objects considered were by Quillen while constructing André–Quillen cohomology for commutative rings. For this section, let all algebras be commutative, associative, and unital. If we let $A$ be a commutative ring, and let $A\backslash R$ be the undercategory of such algebras over $A$ (meaning $A$-algebras), and set $(A\backslash R)/B$ be the associatived overcategory of objects in $A\backslash R$, then an H-object in this category $(A\backslash R)/B$ is an algebra of the form $B\oplus M$ where $M$ is a $B$-module. These algebras have the addition and multiplication operations

$$\begin{align}
(b\oplus m)+(b'\oplus m') &= (b + b')\oplus (m+m') \\
(b\oplus m)\cdot(b'\oplus m') &= (bb')\oplus(bm' + b'm)
\end{align}$$

Note that the multiplication map given above gives the H-object structure $\mu$. Notice that in addition we have the other two structure maps given by

$$\begin{align}
u_{B\oplus M }(b\oplus m) &= b\\
\varepsilon (b) &= b\oplus 0
\end{align}$$

giving the full H-object structure. Interestingly, these objects have the following property:

$\text{Hom}_{(A\backslash R)/B}(Y,B\oplus M) \cong \text{Der}_A(Y, M)$

giving an isomorphism between the $A$-derivations of $Y$ to $M$ and morphisms from $Y$ to the H-object $B\oplus M$. In fact, this implies $B\oplus M$ is an abelian group object in the category $(A\backslash R)/B$ since it gives a contravariant functor with values in Abelian groups.

== See also ==
- André–Quillen cohomology
- Cotangent complex
- H-space
