= H-space =

Concept in topology

In mathematics, an H-space is a homotopy-theoretic version of a generalization of the notion of topological group, in which the axioms on associativity and inverses are removed.

== Definition ==
An H-space consists of a topological space X, together with an element e of X and a continuous map μ : X × X → X, such that μ(e, e) = e and the maps x ↦ μ(x, e) and x ↦ μ(e, x) are both homotopic to the identity map through maps sending e to e. This may be thought of as a pointed topological space together with a continuous multiplication for which the basepoint is an identity element up to basepoint-preserving homotopy.

One says that a topological space X is an H-space if there exists e and μ such that the triple (X, e, μ) is an H-space as in the above definition. Alternatively, an H-space may be defined without requiring homotopies to fix the basepoint e, or by requiring e to be an exact identity, without any consideration of homotopy. In the case of a CW complex, all three of these definitions are in fact equivalent.

== Examples and properties ==
The standard definition of the fundamental group, together with the fact that it is a group, can be rephrased as saying that the loop space of a pointed topological space has the structure of an H-group, as equipped with the standard operations of concatenation and inversion. Furthermore, a continuous basepoint-preserving map of pointed topological spaces induces an H-homomorphism of the corresponding loop spaces; this reflects the group homomorphism on fundamental groups induced by a continuous map.

It is straightforward to verify that, given a pointed homotopy equivalence from an H-space to a pointed topological space, there is a natural H-space structure on the latter space. As such, the existence of an H-space structure on a given space is only dependent on its pointed homotopy type.

The multiplicative structure of an H-space adds structure to its homology and cohomology groups. For example, the cohomology ring of a path-connected H-space with finitely generated and free cohomology groups is a Hopf algebra. Also, one can define the Pontryagin product on the homology groups of an H-space.

The fundamental group of an H-space is abelian. To see this, let X be an H-space with identity e and let f and g be loops at e. Define a map F: [0,1] × [0,1] → X by F(a,b) = f(a)g(b). Then F(a,0) = F(a,1) = f(a)e is homotopic to f, and F(0,b) = F(1,b) = eg(b) is homotopic to g. It is clear how to define a homotopy from [f][g] to [g][f].

Adams' Hopf invariant one theorem, named after Frank Adams, states that S^{0}, S^{1}, S^{3}, and S^{7} are the only spheres that are H-spaces. Each of these spaces forms an H-space by viewing it as the subset of norm-one elements of the reals, complexes, quaternions, and octonions, respectively, and using the multiplication operations from these algebras. In fact, S^{0}, S^{1}, and S^{3} are groups (Lie groups) with these multiplications. But S^{7} is not a group in this way because octonion multiplication is not associative, nor can it be given any other continuous multiplication for which it is a group.

== See also ==
- Topological group
- Čech cohomology
- Hopf algebra
- Topological monoid
- H-object
