= Halperin conjecture =

Mathematical conjecture

In rational homotopy theory, the Halperin conjecture concerns the Serre spectral sequence of certain fibrations. It is named after the Canadian mathematician Stephen Halperin.

== Statement ==
Suppose that $F \to E \to B$ is a fibration of simply connected spaces such that $F$ is rationally elliptic and $\chi(F) \neq 0$ (i.e., $F$ has non-zero Euler characteristic), then the Serre spectral sequence associated to the fibration collapses at the $E_2$ page.

== Status ==
As of 2019, Halperin's conjecture is still open. Gregory Lupton has reformulated the conjecture in terms of formality relations.
