= Wolfgang Soergel =

German mathematician

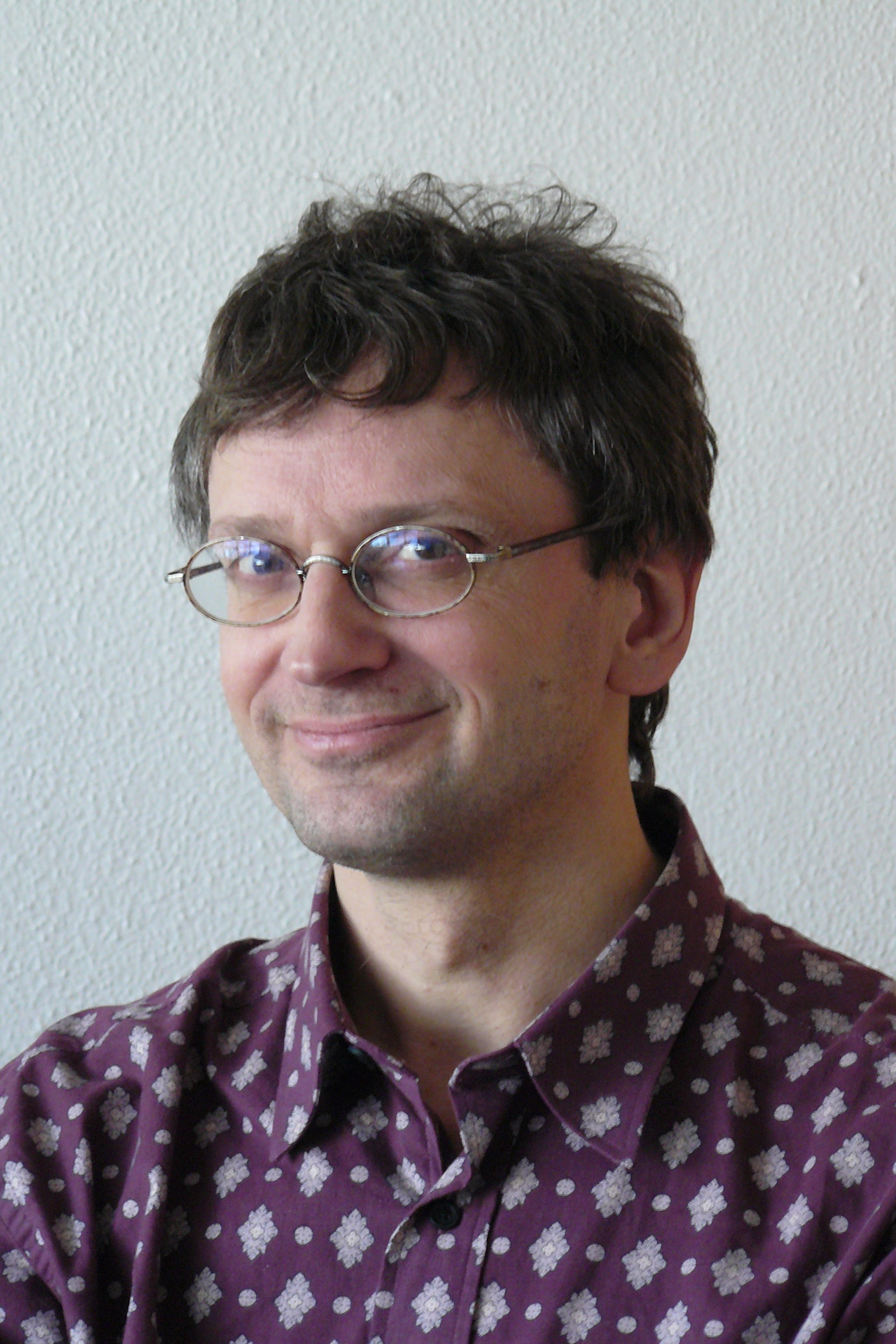
Wolfgang Soergel

Wolfgang Soergel (born 12 June 1962 in Geneva) is a German mathematician, specializing in geometry and representation theory.

== Early life and education ==
Wolfgang Soergel is the son of the physicist Volker Soergel and a grandson of the paleontologist Johannes Wolfgang Adolf Werner Soergel (1887–1946).

Soergel received his Promotion (PhD) in 1988 from the University of Hamburg. His PhD dissertation Universelle versus relative Einhüllende: Eine geometrische Untersuchung von Quotienten von universellen Einhüllenden halbeinfacher Lie-Algebren (Universal versus relative envelopes: a geometric investigation of quotients of universal envelopes of semi-simple Lie algebras) was supervised by Jens Carsten Jantzen.

== Career ==
After postdoctoral positions at UC Berkeley, Harvard University, and MIT, Soergel completed his Habilitation at the University of Bonn in 1991. In 1994 he was appointed to a professorial chair at the University of Freiburg. He was an invited speaker at the 1994 International Congress of Mathematicians in Zurich. Since 2008 he has been a full member of the Heidelberg Academy of Sciences and Humanities.

He is the author or coauthor of over 30 research articles. His research in representation theory has important applications to Kazhdan-Lusztig theory and Koszul duality. The category of Soergel bimodules is named in his honor.

His doctoral students include Karen Günzl, Peter Fiebig, Catharina Stroppel and Geordie Williamson.

== Selected publications ==
- Langlands’ Philosophy and Koszul Duality. In: I. Klaus W. Roggenkamp, Mirela Ștefănescu (ed.): Algebra – representation theory. (Proceedings of the NATO Advanced Study Institute on Algebra – Representation Theory, Constanta, Romania, 2–12 August 2000) (= NATO Science Series. Series 2: Mathematics, Physics and Chemistry. 28). Kluwer Academic, Dordrecht u. a. 2001, ISBN 0-7923-7113-5, pp. 379–414.
- with Alexander Beilinson, Victor Ginzburg: Koszul duality patterns in representation theory. In: Journal of the American Mathematical Society. vol. 9, no. 2, 1996, pp. 473–527, doi:10.1090/S0894-0347-96-00192-0.
- Gradings on Representation Categories. In: Srishti D. Chatterji (ed.): Proceedings of the International Congress of Mathematicians. August 3–11, 1994, Zürich, Switzerland. vol. 2. Basel etc., Birkhäuser 1995, ISBN 3-7643-5153-5, pp. 800–806.
- with Henning H. Andersen, Jens C. Jantzen: Representations of quantum groups at a $p$-th root of unity and of semisimple groups in characteristic $p$: independence of $p$ (= Astérisque. 220, ISSN 0303-1179). Société Mathématique de France, Paris 1994.
- Kategorie 𝓞, perverse Garben, und Moduln über den Koinvarianten zur Weylgruppe. In: Journal of the American Mathematical Society. vol. 3, no. 2, 1990, pp. 421–445, doi:10.1090/S0894-0347-1990-1029692-5.
