= Mark Pollicott =

British mathematician

- Born: 24 September 1959 (age 67); Nottingham, United Kingdom
- Occupation: Mathematician
- Awards: Royal Society University Research Fellowship; two Leverhulme Trust Senior Research Fellowships; E.U. Marie Curie Chair

Academic background
- Education: High Pavement College, Nottingham
- Alma mater: University of Warwick
- Thesis: The Ruelle Operator, Zeta Functions and the Asymptotic Distribution of Closed Orbits (1984)
- Doctoral advisor: Bill Parry

Academic work
- Institutions: University of Edinburgh; University of Porto; University of Manchester; University of Warwick
- Website: warwick.ac.uk/~masdbl/

Mark Pollicott (born 24 September 1959) is a British mathematician known for his contributions to ergodic theory and dynamical systems. He has a particular interest in applications to other areas of mathematics, including geometry, number theory and analysis.

Pollicott attended High Pavement College in Nottingham, where his teachers included the Booker Prize winning author Stanley Middleton. He gained a BSc in Mathematics and Physics in 1981 and a PhD in mathematics in 1984 both at the University of Warwick. His PhD supervisor was Bill Parry and his thesis title The Ruelle Operator, Zeta Functions and the Asymptotic Distribution of Closed Orbits.

He held permanent positions at the University of Edinburgh, University of Porto, and University of Warwick before appointment to the Fielden Chair of Pure Mathematics at the University of Manchester (1996–2004). He then returned to a professorship at Warwick in 2005. In addition, he has held numerous visiting positions including ones at the Institut des Hautes Études Scientifiques in Paris, the Institute for Advanced Study in Princeton, MSRI at the University of California, Berkeley, Caltech, and the University of Grenoble. He has been recipient of a Royal Society University Research Fellowship, two Leverhulme Trust Senior Research Fellowships and an E.U. Marie Curie Chair.

Preceded by Norman Blackburn	Fielden Chair of Pure Mathematics; 1996–2004	Succeeded by Alex Wilkie
