= Koszul duality =

Various mathematical dualites

In mathematics, Koszul duality, named after the French mathematician Jean-Louis Koszul, is any of various kinds of dualities found in representation theory of Lie algebras, abstract algebras (semisimple algebra) and topology (e.g., equivariant cohomology). The prototypical example of Koszul duality was introduced by Joseph Bernstein, Israel Gelfand, and Sergei Gelfand. It establishes a duality between the derived category of a symmetric algebra and that of an exterior algebra, as well as the BGG correspondence, which links the stable category of finite-dimensional graded modules over an exterior algebra to the bounded derived category of coherent sheaves on projective space. The importance of the notion rests on the suspicion that Koszul duality seems quite ubiquitous in nature.

== Koszul duality for graded modules over Koszul algebras ==
The simplest, and in a sense prototypical case of Koszul duality arises as follows: for a 1-dimensional vector space V over a field k, with dual vector space $V^*$, the exterior algebra of V has two non-trivial components, namely

$$\bigwedge^1 V=V, \quad \bigwedge^0 V = k.$$

This exterior algebra and the symmetric algebra of $V^*$, $\operatorname{Sym}(V^*)$, serve to build a two-step chain complex

$$V \otimes_k \operatorname{Sym}(V^*) \to k \otimes_k \operatorname{Sym}(V^*)$$

whose differential is induced by natural evaluation map

$$V \otimes_k V^* \to k, \quad v \otimes_k \varphi \mapsto \varphi(v).$$

Choosing a basis of V, $\operatorname{Sym}(V^*)$ can be identified with the polynomial ring in one variable, $k[t]$, and the previous chain complex becomes isomorphic to the complex

$$k[t] \stackrel{t}{\longrightarrow} k[t]$$

whose differential is multiplication by t. This computation shows that the cohomology of the above complex is 0 at the left hand term, and is k at the right hand term. In other words, k (regarded as a chain complex concentrated in a single degree) is quasi-isomorphic to the above complex, which provides a close link between the exterior algebra of V and the symmetric algebra of its dual.

=== Koszul dual of a Koszul algebra ===
Koszul duality, as treated by Alexander Beilinson, Victor Ginzburg, and Wolfgang Soergel can be formulated using the notion of Koszul algebra. An example of such a Koszul algebra A is the symmetric algebra $S(V)$ on a finite-dimensional vector space. More generally, any Koszul algebra can be shown to be a quadratic algebra, i.e., of the form

$$A = T(V) / R,$$

where $T(V)$ is the tensor algebra on a finite-dimensional vector space, and $R$ is a submodule of $T^2(V) = V \otimes V$. The Koszul dual then coincides with the quadratic dual

$$A^! := T(V^*) / R'$$

where $V^*$ is the (k-linear) dual and $R' \subset V^* \otimes V^*$ consists of those elements on which the elements of R (i.e., the relations in A) vanish. The Koszul dual of $A=S(V)$ is given by $A^! = \Lambda(V^*)$, the exterior algebra on the dual of V. In general, the dual of a Koszul algebra is again a Koszul algebra. Its opposite ring is given by the graded ring of self-extensions of the underlying field k, thought of as an A-module:

$$(A^!)^{\text{opp}} = \operatorname{Ext}^*_A(k, k).$$

=== Koszul duality ===
If an algebra $A$ is Koszul, there is an equivalence between certain subcategories of the derived categories of graded $A$- and $A^{!}$-modules. These subcategories are defined by certain boundedness conditions on the grading vs. the cohomological degree of a complex.

Under suitable finiteness assumptions, specifically, when $A$ is finite-dimensional and its Koszul dual $A^{!}$ is noetherian, there is an equivalence of bounded derived categories $D^{b}(A\text{-gmod}) \simeq D^{b}(A^{!}\text{-gmod})$, i.e., an equivalence between the bounded derived categories of finitely generated graded modules over $A$ and over $A^{!}$.

=== Variants ===
As an alternative to passing to certain subcategories of the derived categories of $A$ and $A^!$ to obtain equivalences, it is possible instead to obtain equivalences between certain quotients of the homotopy categories. Usually these quotients are larger than the derived category, as they are obtained by factoring out some subcategory of the category of acyclic complexes, but they have the advantage that every complex of modules determines some element of the category, without needing to impose boundedness conditions. A different reformulation gives an equivalence between the derived category of $A$ and the 'coderived' category of the coalgebra $(A^!)^*$.

An extension of Koszul duality to D-modules states a similar equivalence of derived categories between dg-modules over the dg-algebra $\Omega_X$ of Kähler differentials on a smooth algebraic variety X and the $D_X$-modules.

== Koszul duality for operads ==
An extension of the above concept of Koszul duality was formulated by Ginzburg and Kapranov who introduced the notion of a quadratic operad and defined the quadratic dual of such an operad. Very roughly, an operad is an algebraic structure consisting of an object of n-ary operations for all n. An algebra over an operad is an object on which these n-ary operations act. For example, there is an operad called the associative operad whose algebras are associative algebras, i.e., depending on the precise context, non-commutative rings (or, depending on the context, non-commutative graded rings, differential graded rings). Algebras over the so-called commutative operad are commutative algebras, i.e., commutative (possibly graded, differential graded) rings. Yet another example is the Lie operad whose algebras are Lie algebras. The quadratic duality mentioned above is such that the associative operad is self-dual, while the commutative and the Lie operad correspond to each other under this duality.

Koszul duality for operads states an equivalence between algebras over dual operads. The special case of associative algebras gives back the functor $A \mapsto A^!$ mentioned above.

== See also ==
- Zinbiel algebra
- BGG correspondence
