= Loop (topology) =

Topological path whose initial point is equal to its terminal point

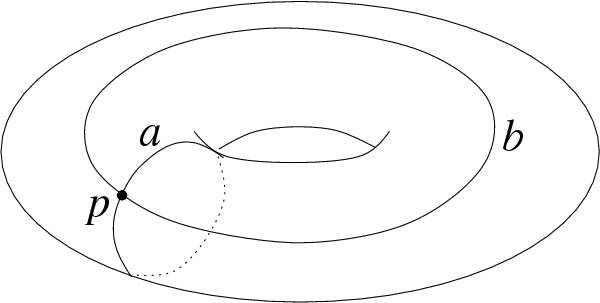
Two loops a, b in a torus.

In mathematics, a loop in a topological space X is a continuous function f from the unit interval I = [0,1] to X such that f(0) = f(1). In other words, it is a path whose initial point is equal to its terminal point.

A loop may also be seen as a continuous map f from the pointed unit circle S^{1} into X, because S^{1} may be regarded as a quotient of I under the identification of 0 with 1.

The set of all loops in X forms a space called the loop space of X.

== Definition ==
Let $X$ be a topological space. A loop is a continuous function $f : [0,1] \to X$ such that $f(0) = f(1)$. If $f$ begins and ends at $x_0 \in X$ the loop is said to be based at $x_0$. A loop is then a path that begins and ends at the same point $x_0$.

The set of homotopy classes of loops based at $x_0$ together with the operation of path composition, forms the fundamental group of $X$ relative to $x_0$, usually denoted by $\pi_1(X,x_0)$.

== See also ==
- Free loop
- Loop group
- Loop space
- Loop algebra
- Fundamental group
- Quasigroup
