= E∞-operad =

Infinite loop space

In the theory of operads in algebra and algebraic topology, an E_{∞}-operad is a parameter space for a multiplication map that is associative and commutative "up to all higher homotopies". (An operad that describes a multiplication that is associative but not necessarily commutative "up to homotopy" is called an A_{∞}-operad.)

== Definition ==
For the definition, it is necessary to work in the category of operads with an action of the symmetric group. An operad A is said to be an E_{∞}-operad if all of its spaces E(n) are contractible; some authors also require the action of the symmetric group S_{n} on E(n) to be free. In other categories than topological spaces, the notion of contractibility has to be replaced by suitable analogs, such as acyclicity in the category of chain complexes.

== E_{n}-operads and n-fold loop spaces ==
The letter E in the terminology stands for "everything" (meaning associative and commutative), and the infinity symbols says that commutativity is required up to "all" higher homotopies. More generally, there is a weaker notion of E_{n}-operad (n ∈ N), parametrizing multiplications that are commutative only up to a certain level of homotopies. In particular,

- E_{1}-spaces are A_{∞}-spaces;
- E_{2}-spaces are homotopy commutative A_{∞}-spaces.

The importance of E_{n}- and E_{∞}-operads in topology stems from the fact that iterated loop spaces, that is, spaces of continuous maps from an n-dimensional sphere to another space X starting and ending at a fixed base point, constitute algebras over an E_{n}-operad. (One says they are E_{n}-spaces.) Conversely, any connected E_{n}-space X is an n-fold loop space on some other space (called B^{n}X, the n-fold classifying space of X).

== Examples ==
The most obvious, if not particularly useful, example of an E_{∞}-operad is the commutative operad c given by c(n) = *, a point, for all n. Note that according to some authors, this is not really an E_{∞}-operad because the S_{n}-action is not free. This operad describes strictly associative and commutative multiplications. By definition, any other E_{∞}-operad has a map to c which is a homotopy equivalence.

The operad of little n-cubes or little n-disks is an example of an E_{n}-operad that acts naturally on n-fold loop spaces.

== See also ==
- operad
- A-infinity operad
- loop space
