= Jean-Louis Loday =

French mathematician (1946–2012)

- Born: 12 January 1946
- Died: 6 June 2012 (aged 66)
- Education: University of Strasbourg
- Known for: Cyclic homology, introduction of Leibniz algebras and Zinbiel algebras
- Scientific career
- Workplaces: Centre national de la recherche scientifique; University of Strasbourg
- Doctoral advisor: Max Karoubi

Jean-Louis Loday (12 January 1946 – 6 June 2012) was a French mathematician who worked on cyclic homology and who introduced Leibniz algebras (sometimes called Loday algebras) and Zinbiel algebras. He occasionally used the pseudonym Guillaume William Zinbiel, formed by reversing the last name of Gottfried Wilhelm Leibniz.

== Education and career ==
Loday studied at Lycée Louis-le-Grand and at École Normale Supérieure in Paris. He completed his Ph.D. at the University of Strasbourg in 1975 under the supervision of Max Karoubi, with a dissertation titled K-Théorie algébrique et représentations de groupes. He went on to become a senior scientist at CNRS and a member of the Institute for Advanced Mathematical Research (IRMA) at the University of Strasbourg.

== Publications ==
- Loday, Jean-Louis (1998), Cyclic homology, Grundlehren der Mathematischen Wissenschaften, vol. 301 (2nd ed.), Berlin, New York: Springer-Verlag, ISBN 978-3-540-63074-6, MR 1600246
- Loday, Jean-Louis & Pirashvili, Teimuraz (1993). "Universal enveloping algebras of Leibniz algebras and (co)homology". Mathematische Annalen. 296 (1): 139–158. doi:10.1007/BF01445099. S2CID 16865683.
- Loday, Jean-Louis; Vallette, Bruno (2012), Algebraic Operads (PDF), Grundlehren der Mathematischen Wissenschaften, vol. 346, Berlin, New York: Springer-Verlag, ISBN 978-3-642-30361-6, archived from the original (PDF) on 2011-08-23
- Zinbiel, Guillaume William (2012), "Encyclopedia of types of algebras 2010", in Guo, Li; Bai, Chengming; Loday, Jean-Louis (eds.), Operads and universal algebra, Nankai Series in Pure, Applied Mathematics and Theoretical Physics, vol. 9, pp. 217–298, arXiv:1101.0267, Bibcode:2011arXiv1101.0267Z, ISBN 978-981-4365-11-6, Zinbiel is a pseudonym of Jean-Louis Loday

== See also ==
- Associahedron
- Blakers–Massey theorem
- Loday functor
