= Parry–Sullivan invariant =

In mathematics, the Parry–Sullivan invariant (or Parry–Sullivan number) is a numerical quantity of interest in the study of incidence matrices in graph theory, and of certain one-dimensional dynamical systems. It provides a partial classification of non-trivial irreducible incidence matrices.

It is named after the English mathematician Bill Parry and the American mathematician Dennis Sullivan, who introduced the invariant in a joint paper published in the journal Topology in 1975.

== Definition ==
Let A be an n × n incidence matrix. Then the Parry–Sullivan number of A is defined to be

$$\mathrm{PS} (A) = \det (I - A),$$

where I denotes the n × n identity matrix.

== Properties ==
It can be shown that, for nontrivial irreducible incidence matrices, flow equivalence is completely determined by the Parry–Sullivan number and the Bowen–Franks group.
