= Bill Parry (mathematician) =

English mathematician

William Parry
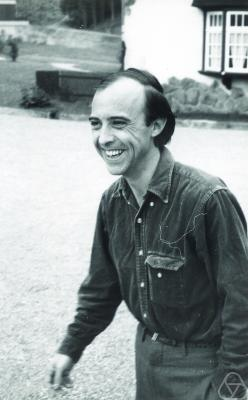
- Parry at Oberwolfach in 1968
- Born: 3 July 1934; Coventry, Warwickshire, England
- Died: 20 August 2006 (aged 72); Marton, Warwickshire, UK
- Occupation: Mathematician
- Known for: Ergodic theory and dynamical systems
- Title: Professor of Mathematics; Fellow of the Royal Society
- Spouse: Benita Teper (m. 1958–2006)
- Children: 1

Academic background
- Education: University College London; University of Liverpool; Imperial College London
- Thesis: Ergodic and mixing transformations (1960)
- Doctoral advisor: Yael Dowker

Academic work
- Institutions: Birmingham University; University of Sussex; University of Warwick
- Doctoral students: Mark Pollicott; Mary Rees

William Parry FRS (3 July 1934 – 20 August 2006) was an English mathematician who worked in dynamical systems, and, in particular, ergodic theory. In particular, he studied subshifts of finite type nilflows.

== Life ==
Bill Parry was born in Coventry in the Warwickshire (now the West Midlands), England, the sixth of seven children. Although he failed the eleven-plus exam, Parry was persuaded by his mathematics teacher at Coventry Junior Technical School, specialising in metalwork and woodwork, to aim for university. To get appropriate tuition, he had to travel to Birmingham Technical College. He won a place at University College London. Following an MSc at the University of Liverpool, he returned to London to study at Imperial College with Yael Dowker, obtaining his PhD in 1960, with thesis Ergodic and mixing transformations.

Having served in lecturing positions at Birmingham University and the University of Sussex, Parry was appointed to a readership at the recently created University of Warwick in 1968; his was the first appointment in analysis. Two years later, he gave a particularly well-received address at the Sixteenth International Congress of Mathematicians in Nice, France, and was promoted to professor.

He played a key role in the Warwick Mathematics Department, and was Chair of the Department for 2 years. The rapid rise of the Department's international reputation was due to many, among whom Parry featured prominently. His great mathematical achievements were recognized by his early election to the Royal Society in 1984; however, he rarely used the title "Fellow of the Royal Society" except to aid specific causes of interest.

Parry continued to contribute to the mathematical community and others' learning up until his death: he taught the University of Warwick's undergraduate course on ergodic theory as late as 2003.

His published works include more than 80 research articles and four books. His doctoral students include Mark Pollicott and Mary Rees.

He died in Marton, Warwickshire, of cancer exacerbated by MRSA, at the age of 72, on 20 August 2006.

== Research ==
In 1975, Parry and Dennis Sullivan introduced the topological Parry–Sullivan invariant for flows in one-dimensional dynamical systems.

== See also ==
- Parry–Daniels map
- Parry–Sullivan invariant
- Parry measure
