= Zinbiel algebra =

In mathematics, a Zinbiel algebra or dual Leibniz algebra is a module over a commutative ring with a bilinear product satisfying the defining identity:

$$(a \circ b) \circ c = a \circ (b \circ c) + a \circ (c \circ b).$$

Zinbiel algebras were introduced by Jean-Louis Loday (1995). The name was proposed by Jean-Michel Lemaire as being "opposite" to Leibniz algebra.

In any Zinbiel algebra, the symmetrised product

$$a \star b = a \circ b + b \circ a$$

is associative.

A Zinbiel algebra is the Koszul dual concept to a Leibniz algebra. The free Zinbiel algebra over V is the tensor algebra with product

$$(x_0 \otimes \cdots \otimes x_p) \circ (x_{p+1} \otimes \cdots \otimes x_{p+q}) =
x_0 \sum_{(p,q)} (x_1,\ldots,x_{p+q}),$$

where the sum is over all $(p,q)$ shuffles.
