= Victor Ginzburg =

Russian American mathematician (born 1957)

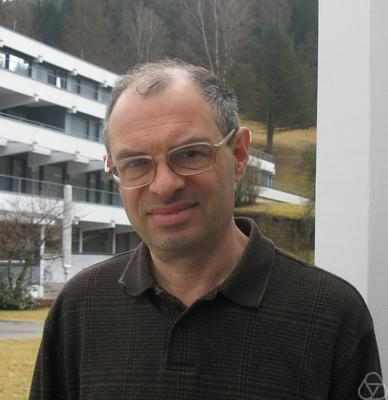
- 2012 in Oberwolfach
- Born: 1957 (age 68–69); Moscow, Russia
- Education: Moscow State University
- Known for: Ginzburg dg algebra Koszul duality
- Scientific career
- Fields: Mathematics
- Workplaces: University of Chicago
- Doctoral advisor: Alexandre Kirillov; Israel Gelfand
- Doctoral students: Apoorva Khare

Victor Ginzburg (born 1957) is a Russian American mathematician who works in representation theory and in noncommutative geometry. He is known for his contributions to geometric representation theory, especially, for his works on representations of quantum groups and Hecke algebras, and on the geometric Langlands program (Satake equivalence of categories). He is currently a Professor of Mathematics at the University of Chicago.

== Career ==
Ginzburg received his Ph.D. at Moscow State University in 1985, under the direction of Alexandre Kirillov and Israel Gelfand.

Ginzburg wrote a textbook Representation theory and complex geometry with Neil Chriss on geometric representation theory.

A paper by Alexander Beilinson, Ginzburg, and Wolfgang Soergel introduced the concept of Koszul duality (cf. Koszul algebra) and the technique of "mixed categories" to representation theory. Furthermore, Ginzburg and Mikhail Kapranov developed Koszul duality theory for operads.

In noncommutative geometry, Ginzburg defined, following earlier ideas of Maxim Kontsevich, the notion of Calabi–Yau algebra. An important role in the theory of motivic Donaldson–Thomas invariants is played by the so-called "Ginzburg dg algebra", a Calabi-Yau (dg)-algebra of dimension 3 associated with any cyclic potential on the path algebra of a quiver.

More recently, Ginzburg applied techniques of mixed l-adic sheaves of Alexander Beilinson, Joseph Bernstein, Pierre Deligne to Symplectic duality, a subject closely related to 3-dimensional Mirror symmetry and Relative Langlands duality.

== Selected publications ==
- Beilinson, Alexander; Ginzburg, Victor; Soergel, Wolfgang (1996), "Koszul duality patterns in representation theory" (PDF), Journal of the American Mathematical Society, 9 (2): 473–527, doi:10.1090/S0894-0347-96-00192-0, MR 1322847
- Chriss, Neil; Ginzburg, Victor (1997), Representation theory and complex geometry, Boston, MA: Birkhäuser, MR 1433132
- Etingof, Pavel; Ginzburg, Victor (2002), "Symplectic reflection algebras, Calogero-Moser space, and deformed Harish-Chandra homomorphism", Inventiones Mathematicae, 147 (2): 243–348, arXiv:math/0011114, Bibcode:2002InMat.147..243E, doi:10.1007/s002220100171, MR 1881922, S2CID 119708574
- Ginzburg, Victor (2005). "Lectures on Noncommutative Geometry". arXiv:math/0506603.
- Ginzburg, Victor (2006). "Calabi-Yau Algebras". arXiv:math/0612139.
- Ginzburg, Victor; Kapranov, Mikhail (1994), "Koszul duality for operads", Duke Mathematical Journal, 76 (1): 203–272, doi:10.1215/S0012-7094-94-07608-4, MR 1301191, S2CID 115166937
- Ginzburg, Victor (2025). "Pointwise purity, Derived Satake, and Symplectic duality". arXiv:2508.15958 [math.RT].
