= Digroup =

In the mathematical area of algebra, a digroup is a generalization of a group that has two one-sided product operations, $\vdash$ and $\dashv$, instead of the single operation in a group. Digroups were introduced independently by Liu (2004), Felipe (2006), and Kinyon (2007), inspired by a question about Leibniz algebras.

To explain digroups, consider a group. In a group there is one operation, such as addition in the set of integers; there is a single "unit" element, like 0 in the integers, and there are inverses, like $-x$ in the integers, for which both the following equations hold: $(-x)+x=0$ and $x+(-x)=0$. A digroup replaces the one operation by two operations that interact in a complicated way, as stated below. A digroup may also have more than one "unit", and an element $x$ may have different inverses for each "unit". This makes a digroup vastly more complicated than a group. Despite that complexity, there are reasons to consider digroups, for which see the references.

== Definition ==
A digroup is a set D with two binary operations, $\vdash$ and $\dashv$, that satisfy the following laws (e.g., Ongay 2010):

- Associativity:

$\vdash$ and $\dashv$ are associative,
$$(x \vdash y) \vdash z = (x \dashv y) \vdash z,$$
$$x \dashv (y \dashv z) = x \dashv (y \vdash z),$$
$$(x \vdash y) \dashv z = x \vdash (y \dashv z).$$

- Bar units: There is at least one bar unit, an $e \in D$, such that for every $x \in D,$

$$e \vdash x = x \dashv e = x.$$

The set of bar units is called the halo of D.

- Inverse: For each bar unit e, each $x \in D$ has a unique e-inverse, $x_e^{-1} \in D$, such that

$$x \vdash x_e^{-1} = x_e^{-1} \dashv x = e.$$

== Generalized digroup ==
In a generalized digroup or g-digroup, a generalization due to Salazar-Díaz, Velásquez, and Wills-Toro (2016), each element has a left inverse and a right inverse instead of one two-sided inverse.

One reason for this generalization is that it permits analogs of the isomorphism theorems of group theory that cannot be formulated within digroups.

== See also ==
- Group theory
- Leibniz algebra
- Binary operation
- Isomorphism theorems
- Semigroup
- Quasigroup
- Loop (algebra)
