= Yael Dowker =

Israeli mathematician (1919–2016)

- יעל דוקר
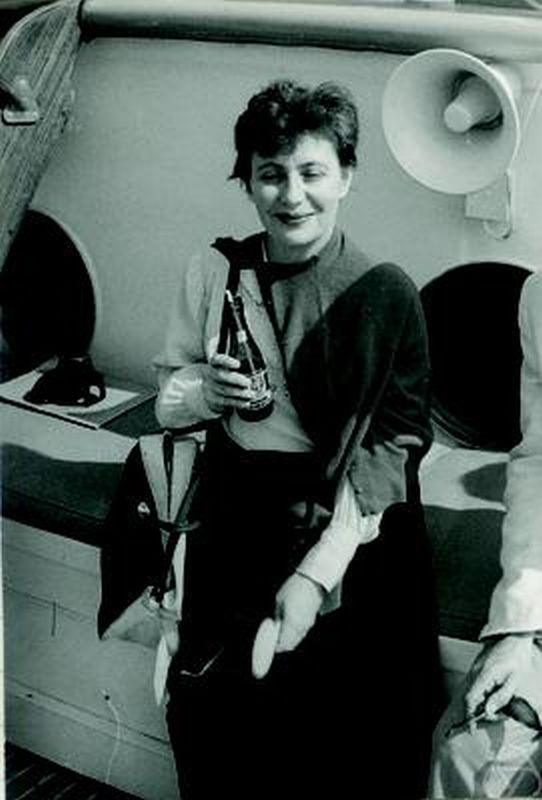
- Yael Dowker in New Orleans, 1961.
- Born: Yael Naim; 30 October 1919; Tel Aviv, Mandatory Palestine
- Died: 28 January 2016 (aged 96); Oxford, England, UK

Academic background
- Education: Johns Hopkins University; Radcliffe College
- Thesis: The Ergodic Theorems and Invariant Measure (1948)
- Doctoral advisor: Witold Hurewicz

Academic work
- Discipline: Mathematics
- Institutions: Institute for Advanced Study, Victoria University of Manchester, University of London
- Notable students: William Parry

Yael Naim Dowker (Hebrew: יעל נעים דוקר; born Yael Naim; 30 October 1919 – 28 January 2016) was an Israeli-born English mathematician, prominent especially due to her work in the fields of measure theory, ergodic theory and topological dynamics.

== Biography ==
Yael Naim (later Dowker) was born in Tel Aviv. She left for the United States to study at Johns Hopkins University in Baltimore, Maryland. In 1941, as a graduate student, she met Clifford Hugh Dowker, a Canadian topologist working as an instructor there. The couple married in 1944. From 1943 to 1946 they worked together at the Radiation Laboratory at Massachusetts Institute of Technology. Clifford also worked as a civilian adviser for the United States Air Force during World War II.

Dowker did her doctorate at Radcliffe College (in Cambridge, Massachusetts) under Witold Hurewicz (a Polish mathematician known for the Hurewicz theorem). She published her thesis Invariant measure and the ergodic theorems in 1947 and received her Ph.D. in 1948. In the period between 1948 and 1949, she did post-doctoral work at the Institute for Advanced Study, located in Princeton, New Jersey. A few years after the war, McCarthyism became a common phenomenon in the academic world, with several of the Dowker couple's friends in the mathematical community harassed and one arrested. In 1950, they emigrated to the United Kingdom.

In 1951 Dowker was appointed as assistant lecturer at the University of Manchester, and later went to the Imperial College London, where she was the first female reader within the department. While there, among the students she advised was Bill Parry, who published his thesis in 1960. She also cooperated on some of her work with the Hungarian mathematician Paul Erdős (Erdős' number of one). She worked with her husband with gifted children who were having difficulties at school for the National association for gifted children.

== Legacy ==
The best PhD award at Imperial College London is given in her name each year.

== Works ==
- Invariant measure and the ergodic theorems, Duke Math. J. 14 (1947), 1051–1061
- Finite and $\sigma$-finite measures, Annals of Mathematics, 54 (1951), 595–608
- The mean and transitive points of homeomorphisms, Annals of Mathematics, 58 (1953), 123–133
- On limit sets in dynamical systems, Proc. London Math. Soc. 4 (1954), 168–176 (with Friedlander, F. G.)
- On minimal sets in dynamical systems, Quart. J. Math. Oxford Ser. (2) 7 (1956), 5–16
- Some examples in ergodic theory, Proc. London Math. Soc. 9 (1959), 227–241 (with Erdős, Paul)
