= Infinite loop space machine =

In topology, a branch of mathematics, given a topological monoid X up to homotopy (in a nice way), an infinite loop space machine produces a group completion of X together with infinite loop space structure. For example, one can take X to be the classifying space of a symmetric monoidal category S; that is, $X = BS$. Then the machine produces the group completion $BS \to K(S)$. The space $K(S)$ may be described by the K-theory spectrum of S.

In 1977, 25-year-old Robert Thomason proved the equivalence of all infinite loop space machines. He published this result next year in a joint paper with Jon Peter May.
