= Pseudo-tensor category =

In mathematics, specifically category theory, a pseudo-tensor category is a generalization of a symmetric monoidal category (also known as a tensor category) introduced by A. Beilinson and V. Drinfeld in their book "Chiral algebras".

The notion can also be defined as a colored operad or multicategory. In particular, a pseudo-tensor category with a single object is the same as an operad.

== Definition ==
A pseudo-tensor category C consists of the following data

- A class of objects,
- For each finite set $I$, each finite set of objects $X_i, i \in I$ parametrized by $I$ and another object $Y$, the set
  $$P_I(\{ X_i \}, Y),$$
- For each surjective map $J \to I$ between finite sets, finite sets of objects $\{ Y_i \}_{i \in I}, \{ X_j \}_{j \in J}$ and an object Z, the map
  $$\circ : P_I(\{ Y_i \}, Z) \times \prod_{i \in I} P_{\pi^{-1}(i)}(\{ X_j \}, Y_i) \to P_J(\{ X_j \}, Z),$$
- For each object $X$, the element $\operatorname{id}_X$ in $P_*(\{ X \}, X)$ where * is a set with a single element,

subject to the associativity and the unitality axioms

- for surjective maps $K \to J$ and $J \to I$, $\varphi \circ (\psi_i \circ \chi_j) = (\varphi \circ \psi_i) \circ \chi_j$,
- $\operatorname{id}_Y \circ \varphi = \varphi \circ \operatorname{id}_{X_i} = \varphi$.

Let C be a pseudo-tensor category. For given objects $X, Y$, let $\operatorname{Hom}(X, Y) = P_{*}(\{ X \}, Y)$. Then the class of objects in $C$ together with Hom, $\circ$ and the identities form a category. Thus, a pseudo-tensor category can be thought of as a category together with extra data. In particular, a category is the same thing as a pseudo-tensor category with $P_I = \emptyset, \# I > 1$.

On the other extreme, a pseudo-tensor category with a single object is the same as an operad. Indeed, a category with a single object is a monoid (unital semigroup) and thus a pseudo-tensor category with a single is like a monoid but with various n-ary operators. A finite set $\{ X_i \}_{i \in I}$ in the definition of a pseudo-tensor is an unordered finite set. This amounts to the invariance under a symmetric group in the definition of an operad.

Finally, let C be a symmetric monoidal category. Then let

$$P_I(\{ X_i \}, Y) = \operatorname{Hom}(\otimes_{i \in I} X_i, Y),$$

which is well-defined since C is symmetric. The symmetric-monoidal structure include coherent isomorphisms

$$\otimes_{j \in J} X_j \overset{\sim}\to \otimes_{i \in I} (\otimes_{j \in \pi^{-1}(i)} X_j)$$

which gives $\circ$ in the definition of a pseudo-tensor category. Conversely, a pseudo-tensor category with such $\otimes_{i \in I} X_i$ and coherent isomorphisms defines a symmetric monoidal category. In this way, a pseudo-tensor category generalizes a symmetric monoidal category.

In the definition, we can drop the symmetry requirement; namely, instead of a finite set of objects, we can use a finite sequence of objects. In this case, we get the notion of a multicategory. In other words, a pseudo-tensor category is (essentially) a symmetric multicategory.

== Linear case ==
Like an enriched category, a pseudo-tensor category can also be defined over a symmetric monoidal category V; namely, we require $P_I$ as well as $\circ$ take values in V instead of the category of sets in the definition. A particularly important case is when V is the category of vector spaces; i.e., the images of $P_I$ are sets of multilinear maps and if tensor product is available,

$$P_I(\{X_i\}, Y) = \operatorname{Hom}(\otimes_{i \in I} X_i, Y).$$
