= Mary Rees =

British mathematician

Susan Mary Rees (born 31 July 1953) is a British mathematician and an emeritus professor of mathematics at the University of Liverpool since 2018, specialising in research in complex dynamical systems.

== Career ==
Rees was born in Cambridge. After obtaining her BA in 1974 and MSc in 1975 at St Hugh's College, Oxford, she did research in mathematics under the direction of Bill Parry at the University of Warwick, obtaining a PhD in 1978. Her first postdoctoral position was at the Institute for Advanced Study from 1978 to 1979. Later she worked at Institut des hautes études scientifiques and the University of Minnesota. Following this she worked at the University of Liverpool until her retirement. She became professor of mathematics in 2002 and retired in 2018, becoming an emeritus professor.

She was awarded a Whitehead Prize of the London Mathematical Society in 1988. The citation notes that, in particular,

Her most spectacular theorem has been to show that in the space of rational maps of the Riemann sphere of degree d ≥ 2 those maps that are ergodic with respect to Lebesgue measure and leave invariant an absolutely continuous probability measure form a set of positive measure.

She also spoke at the ICM at Kyoto in 1990. In recent years, much of Rees' work has focused on the dynamics of quadratic rational maps; i.e. rational maps of the Riemann sphere of degree two, including an extensive monograph. In 2004, she also presented an alternative proof of the Ending Laminations Conjecture of Thurston, which had been proved by Brock, Canary and Minsky shortly before.

== FRS ==
She was elected to a Fellowship of the Royal Society in 2002.

== Family ==
Her father David Rees was also a distinguished mathematician, who worked on Enigma in Hut 6 at Bletchley Park. Her sister Sarah Rees is also a mathematician.

== Works ==
- Mary Rees (2010) "Multiple equivalent matings with the aeroplane polynomial". Ergodic Theory and Dynamical Systems, pp. 20
- Mary Rees (2008) "William Parry FRS 1934–2006". Biographical Memoirs of the Royal Society, 54, pp. 229–243
- Mary Rees (2004) "Teichmuller distance is not $C^{2+\varepsilon }$". Proc London Math, 88, pp. 114–134
- Mary Rees (2003) "Views of Parameter Space: Topographer and Resident". Asterisque, 288, pp. 1–418
- Mary Rees (2002) "Teichmuller distance for analytically finite surfaces is $C^{2}$." Proc. London Math. Soc. 85 (2002) 686 – 716.,85, pp. 686–716
