= Apoorva Khare =

Indian mathematician (born 1980)

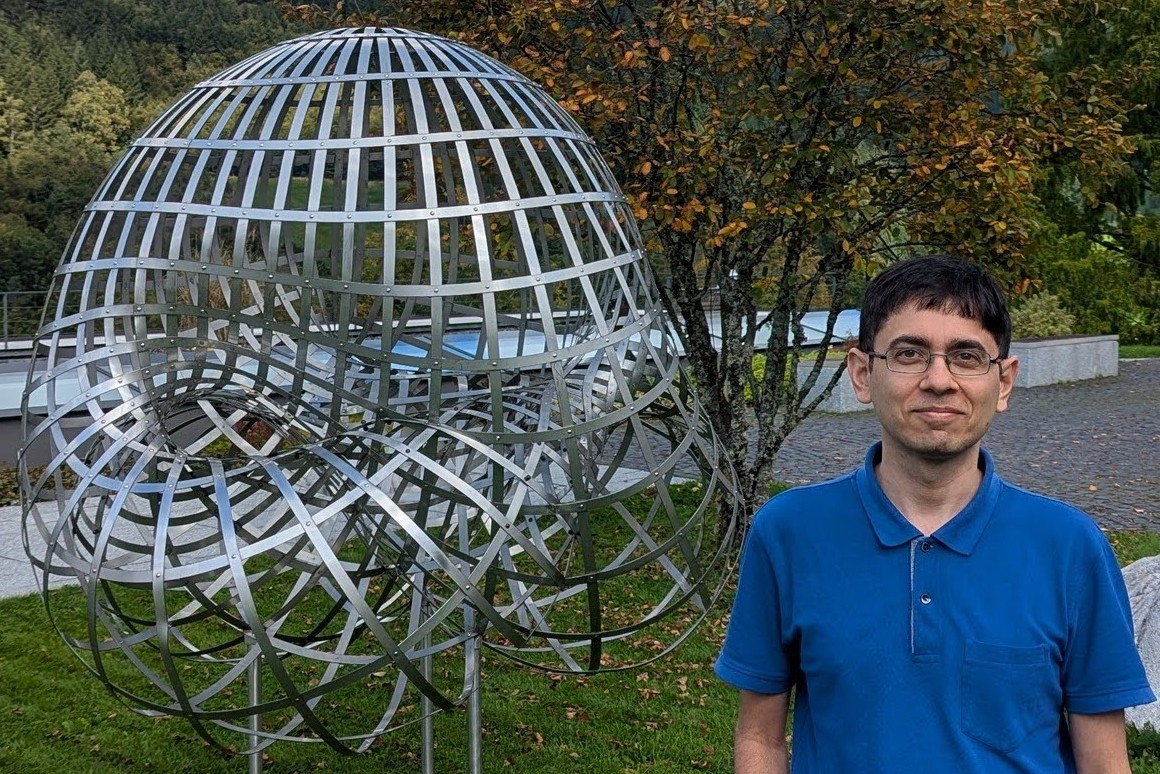
- Born: 1980
- Education: Indian Statistical Institute; University of Chicago
- Awards: Ganit Ratna Award (2025); Shanti Swarup Bhatnagar Prize for Science and Technology (2023); Fellow of the Indian Academy of Sciences (2022); Swarnajayanti Fellowship (2020); Ramanujan Fellowship (2018)
- Scientific career
- Fields: Mathematics
- Workplaces: Indian Institute of Science; Stanford University; Yale University; University of California at Riverside
- Doctoral advisor: Victor Ginzburg

Apoorva Khare (Marathi: अपूर्व खरे, born 1980) is an Indian mathematician who works in matrix positivity and analysis, combinatorics and discrete mathematics, and representation theory. He was awarded the Shanti Swarup Bhatnagar Prize for Science and Technology, the highest science award in India, for the year 2022 in Mathematical Sciences.

Khare did his schooling in Bhubaneswar, Odisha until 1997, at Demonstration Multipurpose School and Buxi Jagabandhu Bidyadhar College. He obtained his B.Stat. (2000) from the Indian Statistical Institute at Kolkata, and his M.S. (2001) and Ph.D. (2006) in Mathematics from the University of Chicago. He then held postdoctoral positions at the University of California at Riverside and Yale University, and a Research Associateship at Stanford University before joining the Indian Institute of Science in Bangalore, where he is currently a Professor in Mathematics.

Besides the Bhatnagar Prize, Khare is also a recipient of the Swarnajayanti Fellowship and the Ramanujan Fellowship from SERB/DST, Govt. of India. He was invited to deliver the 2022 Hansraj Gupta Memorial Award Lecture and was awarded the A.K. Agarwal Award 2023 and (jointly) the B.N. Waphare Award 2024 by the Indian Mathematical Society.

Khare has been elected a Fellow of the Indian Academy of Sciences. In a publication by the Government of India celebrating 75 years of Indian independence, Khare was listed as one of the 75 scientists aged under 50 who are "shaping today's India". He also delivered a plenary talk (the ILAS Invited Address) at the 2023 AMS Joint Mathematics Meetings in Boston, USA. In 2024, Khare became a laureate of the Asian Scientist 100 by the Asian Scientist. In 2025, he received the Ganit Ratna Award from Professor Thakare Gaurav Sanstha, and was also selected as a Simons Associate of the International Centre for Theoretical Physics.

== Books Authored ==
- Beautiful, Simple, Exact, Crazy, Mathematics in the Real World 13, Yale University Press, New Haven, London, 2015. ISBN 9780300190892
- Matrix analysis and entrywise positivity preservers Vol. 471 in London Mathematical Society Lecture Note Series, Cambridge University Press, xxii+292 pp.; and Vol. 82 in Texts and Readings In Mathematics (TRIM Series), Hindustan Book Agency, xxii+339 pp. ISBN 9781108867122
