= Gray's conjecture =

Topological theorem on spheres

In topology, Gray's conjecture is a conjecture made by Brayton Gray in 1984 about maps between loop spaces of spheres. It was later proved by John Harper.
