= No-wandering-domain theorem =

Mathematical theorem

In mathematics, the no-wandering-domain theorem is a result on dynamical systems, proven by Dennis Sullivan in 1985.

The theorem states that a rational map f : Ĉ → Ĉ with deg(f) ≥ 2 does not have a wandering domain, where Ĉ denotes the Riemann sphere. More precisely, for every component U in the Fatou set of f, the sequence

$$U,f(U),f(f(U)),\dots,f^n(U), \dots$$

will eventually become periodic. Here, f^{n} denotes the n-fold iteration of f, that is,

$$f^n = \underbrace{f \circ f\circ \cdots \circ f}_n .$$

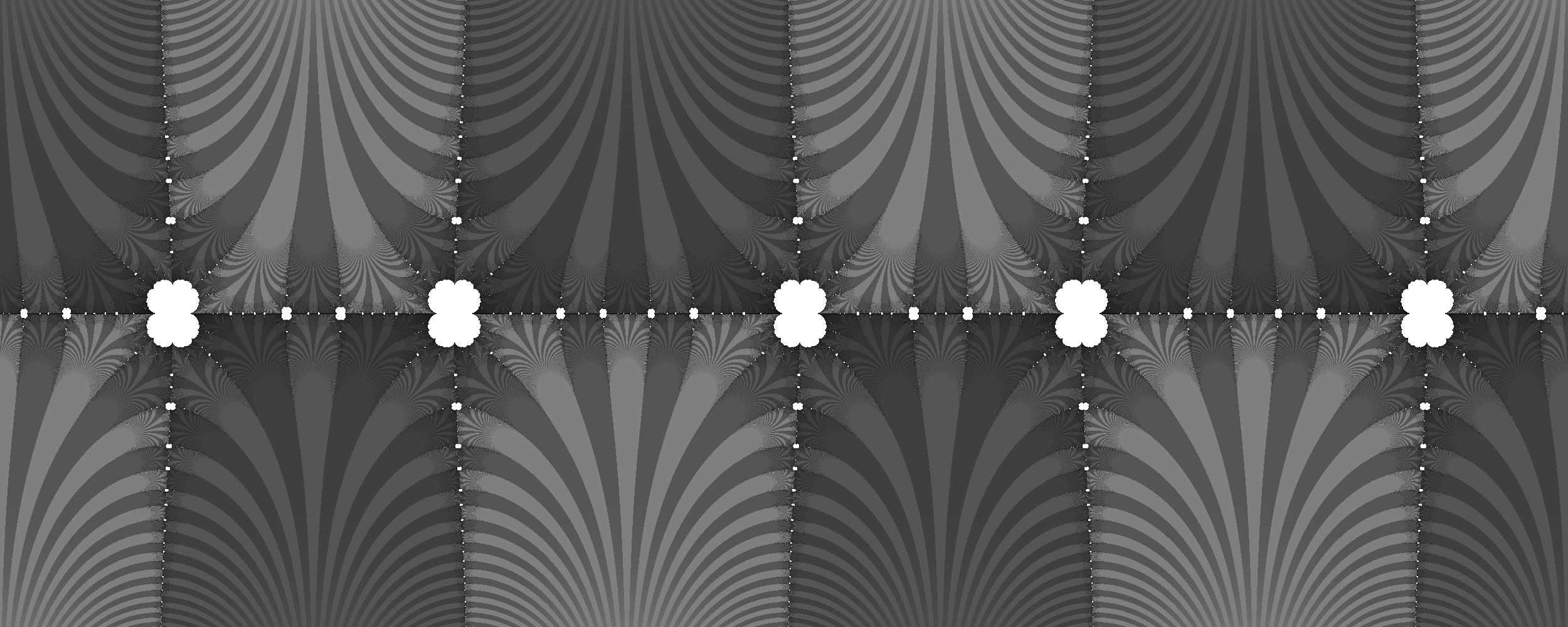
This image illustrates the dynamics of $f(z)=z+2\pi\sin(z)$; the Fatou set (consisting entirely of wandering domains) is shown in white, while the Julia set is shown in tones of gray.

The theorem does not hold for arbitrary maps; for example, the transcendental map $f(z)=z+2\pi\sin(z)$ has wandering domains. However, the result can be generalized to many situations where the functions naturally belong to a finite-dimensional parameter space, most notably to transcendental entire and meromorphic functions with a finite number of singular values.
