= Robert Wayne Thomason =

American mathematician

- Born: November 5, 1952; Tulsa, Oklahoma, United States
- Died: November 5, 1995 (aged 43); Paris, France
- Education: Michigan State University; Princeton University
- Known for: Work on algebraic K-theory
- Scientific career
- Fields: Mathematics
- Workplaces: Massachusetts Institute of Technology; University of Chicago; Johns Hopkins University
- Thesis: Homotopy Colimits in Cat(+ Category of Small Categories) with Applications to Algebraic K-Theory and Loop Space Theory (1977)
- Doctoral advisor: John Coleman Moore

Robert Wayne Thomason (5 November 1952 – 5 November 1995) was an American mathematician who worked on algebraic K-theory. His results include a proof that all infinite loop space machines are in some sense equivalent, and progress on the Quillen–Lichtenbaum conjecture.

Born in Tulsa, Oklahoma, Thomason did his undergraduate studies at Michigan State University, graduating with a B.S. in mathematics in 1973. He completed his Ph.D. at Princeton University in 1977, under the supervision of John Moore. According to Charles Weibel, Thomason proved the equivalence of all infinite loop space machines in June 1977, as a 24-year-old graduate student, publishing this result the year after in a joint paper with John Peter May.

From 1977 to 1979 he was a C. L. E. Moore instructor at the Massachusetts Institute of Technology, where he wrote his article showing that the category Cat of small categories has a structure of Quillen model category that is Quillen-equivalent to the categories of simplicial sets and topological spaces. From 1979 to 1980 he was a Dickson Assistant Professor at the University of Chicago before resigning due to "perceived persecution" by senior faculty. After spending a year as a lecturer at MIT and another at the Institute for Advanced Study, he was appointed as faculty at Johns Hopkins University in 1983. While there, he was awarded a Sloan Research Fellowship, which allowed him to spend the year 1987 at Rutgers University.

Thomason's most influential work is a joint paper with Thomas Trobaugh, even though Trobaugh had died by the time this paper was written. According to Weibel, "On January 22, 1988, [Thomason] had a dream in which Thomas Trobaugh, who had passed away recently, told him how to solve the [most difficult] final step. [..] In gratitude [Thomason] listed his friend as a coauthor of the resulting paper." Among the many results of this paper are construction of the K-theory spectrum for the category of perfect complexes of coherent sheaves on a scheme, and the proof for localization theorems in algebraic K-theory which include the case of non-regular schemes (Theorem 2.1). Thomason also proved Mayer–Vietoris-type theorem for algebraic K-theory of schemes. Following the publication of his paper with Trobaugh, Thomason was invited to give an invited talk at the 1990 International Congress of Mathematicians in Kyoto. From October 1989, Thomason held a position in Max Karoubi's laboratory at the University of Paris VII.

Thomason suffered from diabetes; in early November 1995, just shy of his 43rd birthday, he went into diabetic shock and died in his apartment in Paris.

== Publications ==
- May, J. Peter; Thomason, R. (1978), "The uniqueness of infinite loop space machines", Topology, 17 (3): 205–224, doi:10.1016/0040-9383(78)90026-5, ISSN 0040-9383, MR 0508885
- Thomason, R. W. (1980), "Cat as a closed model category", Cahiers de Topologie et Géométrie Différentielle Catégoriques, 21 (3): 305–324, ISSN 1245-530X, MR 0591388
- Thomason, Robert W. (1985), "Algebraic K-theory and étale cohomology" (PDF), Annales Scientifiques de l'École Normale Supérieure, Quatrième Série, 18 (3): 437–552, doi:10.24033/asens.1495, ISSN 0012-9593, MR 0826102 Erratum
- Thomason, Robert W.; Trobaugh, Thomas (1990), "Higher Algebraic K-Theory of Schemes and of Derived Categories", The Grothendieck Festschrift Volume III, Progr. Math., vol. 88, Boston, MA: Birkhäuser Boston, pp. 247–435, doi:10.1007/978-0-8176-4576-2_10, ISBN 978-0-8176-3487-2, MR 1106918
- Thomason, Robert W. (1991), "The local to global principle in algebraic K-theory", in Satake, Ichirô (ed.), Proceedings of the International Congress of Mathematicians, Vol. I (Kyoto, 1990), Tokyo: Math. Soc. Japan, pp. 381–394, ISBN 978-4-431-70047-0, MR 1159226, archived from the original on 2017-11-25
