= Localization of a topological space =

In mathematics, well-behaved topological spaces can be localized at primes, in a similar way to the localization of a ring at a prime. This construction was described by Dennis Sullivan in 1970 lecture notes that were finally published in (Sullivan 2005).

The reason to do this was in line with an idea of making topology, more precisely algebraic topology, more geometric. Localization of a space X is a geometric form of the algebraic device of choosing 'coefficients' in order to simplify the algebra, in a given problem. Instead of that, the localization can be applied to the space X, directly, giving a second space Y.

== Definitions ==
We let A be a subring of the rational numbers, and let X be a simply connected CW complex. Then there is a simply connected CW complex Y together with a map from X to Y such that

- Y is A-local; this means that all its homology groups are modules over A
- The map from X to Y is universal for (homotopy classes of) maps from X to A-local CW complexes.

This space Y is unique up to homotopy equivalence, and is called the localization of X at A.

If A is the localization of Z at a prime p, then the space Y is called the localization of X at p.

The map from X to Y induces isomorphisms from the A-localizations of the homology and homotopy groups of X to the homology and homotopy groups of Y.

== See also ==
Category:Localization (mathematics)

- Local analysis
- Localization of a category
- Localization of a module
- Localization of a ring
- Bousfield localization
