= Free loop =

Topological variant of the loop

In the mathematical field of topology, a free loop is a variant of the notion of a loop. Whereas a loop has a distinguished point on it, called its basepoint, a free loop lacks such a distinguished point. Formally, let $X$ be a topological space. Then a free loop in $X$ is an equivalence class of continuous functions from the circle $S^1$ to $X$. Two loops are equivalent if they differ by a reparameterization of the circle. That is, $f \sim g$ if there exists a homeomorphism $\psi : S^1 \rightarrow S^1$ such that $g = f\circ\psi.$

Thus, a free loop, as opposed to a based loop used in the definition of the fundamental group, is a map from the circle to the space without the basepoint-preserving restriction. Assuming the space is path-connected, free homotopy classes of free loops correspond to conjugacy classes in the fundamental group.

Recently, interest in the space of all free loops $LX$ has grown with the advent of string topology, i.e. the study of new algebraic structures on the homology of the free loop space.

== See also ==
- Loop space
- Loop (topology)
- Quasigroup
