= Stable module category =

In mathematics, especially representation theory, the stable module category is a quotient of a module category in which projectives are "factored out."

== Definition ==
Let R be a ring. For two modules M and N over R, define $\underline{\mathrm{Hom}}(M,N)$ to be the set of R-linear maps from M to N modulo the relation that f ~ g if f − g factors through a projective module. The stable module category is defined by setting the objects to be the R-modules, and the morphisms are the equivalence classes $\underline{\mathrm{Hom}}(M,N)$.

Given a module M, let P be a projective module with a surjection $p \colon P \to M$. Then set $\Omega(M)$ to be the kernel of p. Suppose we are given a morphism $f \colon M \to N$ and a surjection $q \colon Q \to N$ where Q is projective. Then one can lift f to a map $P \to Q$ which maps $\Omega(M)$ into $\Omega(N)$. This gives a well-defined functor $\Omega$ from the stable module category to itself.

For certain rings, such as Frobenius algebras, $\Omega$ is an equivalence of categories. In this case, the inverse $\Omega^{-1}$ can be defined as follows. Given M, find an injective module I with an inclusion $i \colon M \to I$. Then $\Omega^{-1}(M)$ is defined to be the cokernel of i. A case of particular interest is when the ring R is a group algebra.

The functor Ω^{−1} can even be defined on the module category of a general ring (without factoring out projectives), as the cokernel of the injective envelope. It need not be true in this case that the functor Ω^{−1} is actually an inverse to Ω. One important property of the stable module category is it allows defining the Ω functor for general rings. When R is perfect (or M is finitely generated and R is semiperfect), then Ω(M) can be defined as the kernel of the projective cover, giving a functor on the module category. However, in general projective covers need not exist, and so passing to the stable module category is necessary.

== Connections with cohomology ==
Now we suppose that R = kG is a group algebra for some field k and some group G. One can show that there exist isomorphisms

$$\underline{\mathrm{Hom}}(\Omega^n(M), N) \cong \mathrm{Ext}^n_{kG}(M,N) \cong \underline{\mathrm{Hom}}(M, \Omega^{-n}(N))$$

for every positive integer n. The group cohomology of a representation M is given by $\mathrm{H}^n(G; M) = \mathrm{Ext}^n_{kG}(k, M)$ where k has a trivial G-action, so in this way the stable module category gives a natural setting in which group cohomology lives.

Furthermore, the above isomorphism suggests defining cohomology groups for negative values of n, and in this way one recovers Tate cohomology.

== Triangulated structure ==
An exact sequence

$$0 \to X \to E \to Y \to 0$$

in the usual module category defines an element of $\mathrm{Ext}^1_{kG}(Y,X)$, and hence an element of $\underline{\mathrm{Hom}}(Y, \Omega^{-1}(X))$, so that we get a sequence

$$X \to E \to Y \to \Omega^{-1}(X).$$

Taking $\Omega^{-1}$ to be the translation functor and such sequences as above to be exact triangles, the stable module category becomes a triangulated category.

== See also ==
- Stable homotopy theory
