= Operad algebra =

In algebra, an operad algebra is an "algebra" over an operad. It is a generalization of an associative algebra over a commutative ring R, with an operad replacing R.

== Definitions ==
Given an operad O (say, a symmetric sequence in a symmetric monoidal ∞-category C), an algebra over an operad, or O-algebra for short, is, roughly, a left module over O with multiplications parametrized by O.

If O is a topological operad, then one can say an algebra over an operad is an O-monoid object in C. If C is symmetric monoidal, this recovers the usual definition.

Let C be a symmetric monoidal ∞-category with monoidal structure distributive over colimits. If $f: O \to O'$ is a map of operads and, moreover, if f is a homotopy equivalence, then the ∞-category of algebras over O in C is equivalent to the ∞-category of algebras over O' in C.

== See also ==
- En-ring
- Homotopy Lie algebra
