= Loop space =

Topological space

In topology, a branch of mathematics, the loop space ΩX of a pointed topological space X is the space of (based) loops in X, i.e. continuous pointed maps from the pointed circle S^{1} to X, equipped with the compact-open topology. Two loops can be multiplied by concatenation. With this operation, the loop space is an A_{∞}-space. That is, the multiplication is homotopy-coherently associative.

The set of path components of ΩX, i.e. the set of based-homotopy equivalence classes of based loops in X, is a group, the fundamental group π_{1}(X).

The iterated loop spaces of X are formed by applying Ω a number of times.

There is an analogous construction for topological spaces without basepoint. The free loop space of a topological space X is the space of maps from the circle S^{1} to X with the compact-open topology. The free loop space of X is often denoted by $\mathcal{L}X$.

As a functor, the free loop space construction is right adjoint to cartesian product with the circle, while the loop space construction is right adjoint to the reduced suspension. This adjunction accounts for much of the importance of loop spaces in stable homotopy theory. (A related phenomenon in computer science is currying, where the cartesian product is adjoint to the hom functor.) Informally this is referred to as Eckmann–Hilton duality.

== Eckmann–Hilton duality ==
The loop space is dual to the suspension of the same space; this duality is sometimes called Eckmann–Hilton duality. The basic observation is that

$$[\Sigma Z,X] \approxeq [Z, \Omega X]$$

where $[A,B]$ is the set of homotopy classes of maps $A \rightarrow B$, and $\Sigma A$ is the suspension of A, and $\approxeq$ denotes the natural homeomorphism. This homeomorphism is essentially that of currying, modulo the quotients needed to convert the products to reduced products.

In general, $[A, B]$ does not have a group structure for arbitrary spaces $A$ and $B$. However, it can be shown that $[\Sigma Z,X]$ and $[Z, \Omega X]$ do have natural group structures when $Z$ and $X$ are pointed, and the aforementioned isomorphism is of those groups. Thus, setting $Z = S^{k-1}$ (the $k-1$ sphere) gives the relationship

$$\pi_k(X) \approxeq \pi_{k-1}(\Omega X)$$.

This follows since the homotopy group is defined as $\pi_k(X)=[S^k,X]$ and the spheres can be obtained via suspensions of each-other, i.e. $S^k=\Sigma S^{k-1}$.

== See also ==
- Bott periodicity
- Eilenberg–MacLane space
- Free loop
- Fundamental group
- Gray's conjecture
- Infinite loop space machine
- List of topologies
- Loop group
- Path (topology)
- Spectrum (topology)
- Path space (algebraic topology)
