= Jean Taylor =

American mathematician

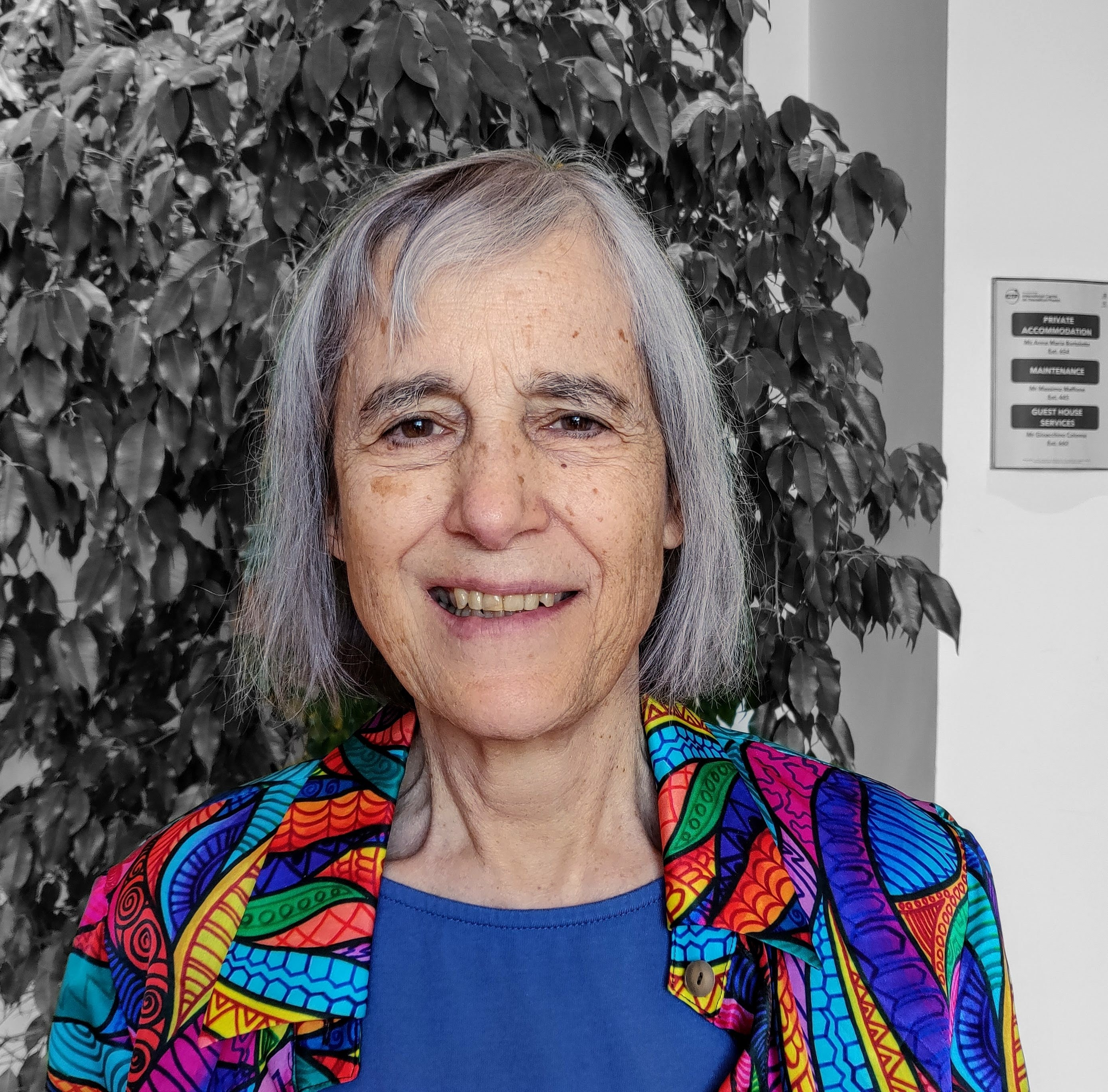
- Jean Ellen Taylor in 2019
- Born: Jean Ellen Taylor; September 17, 1944 (age 81); San Mateo, California
- Education: University of California, Berkeley, University of Warwick, Princeton University
- Spouses: John Guckenheimer, Frederick J. Almgren Jr., William T. Golden
- Awards: Fellow of: American Academy of Arts and Sciences, American Association for the Advancement of Science, Association for Women in Mathematics, American Mathematical Society
- Scientific career
- Workplaces: Rutgers University
- Thesis: Regularity of the Singular-Set of Two-Dimensional Area-Minimizing Flat-Chains Modulo 3 in R^{3} (1973)
- Doctoral advisor: Shiing-Shen Chern, Frederick J. Almgren, Jr.

Jean Ellen Taylor (born 1944) is an American mathematician who is a professor emerita at Rutgers University and visiting faculty at the Courant Institute of Mathematical Sciences of New York University.

== Biography ==
Taylor was born in Northern California. She did her undergraduate studies at Mount Holyoke College, graduating summa cum laude with an A.B. in 1966. She began her graduate studies in chemistry at the University of California, Berkeley, but after receiving an M.Sc. she switched to mathematics under the mentorship of Shiing-Shen Chern and then transferred to the University of Warwick and received a second M.Sc. in mathematics there. She completed a doctorate in 1973 from Princeton University under the supervision of Frederick J. Almgren, Jr.

Taylor joined the Rutgers faculty in 1973, and retired in 2002. She was president of the Association for Women in Mathematics from 1999 to 2001.

She has been married three times, to mathematicians John Guckenheimer and Frederick Almgren, and to financier and science advocate William T. Golden.

== Research ==
Taylor is known for her work on the mathematics of soap bubbles and of the growth of crystals. In 1973 she published her dissertation on "Regularity of the Singular Set of Two-Dimensional Area-Minimizing Flat Chains Modulo 3 in R3" which solved a long-standing problem about length and smoothness of soap-film triple function curves. In 1976 she, along with Almgren, published the first proof of Plateau's laws, a description of the shapes formed by soap bubble clusters that had been formulated without proof in the 19th century by Joseph Plateau. Encyclopedia Britannica called the mathematical derivation "one of the major triumphs of global analysis".

== Awards and honors ==
Taylor is a fellow of the American Academy of Arts and Sciences, the American Association for the Advancement of Science, the American Mathematical Society, and the Society for Industrial and Applied Mathematics. In 2001, she received an honorary doctorate from Mount Holyoke College. In 2017, she was selected as a fellow of the Association for Women in Mathematics in the inaugural class.

== Selected publications ==
- Taylor, Jean E. (1976), "The structure of singularities in soap-bubble-like and soap-film-like minimal surfaces", Annals of Mathematics, Second Series, 103 (3): 489–539, doi:10.2307/1970949, JSTOR 1970949, MR 0428181.
- Taylor, J. E.; Cahn, J. W.; Handwerker, C. A. (1992), "Overview No. 98. I. Geometric models of crystal growth", Acta Metallurgica et Materialia, 40 (7): 1443–1474, doi:10.1016/0956-7151(92)90090-2.
- Taylor, J. E. (1992), "Overview No. 98. II. Mean curvature and weighted mean curvature", Acta Metallurgica et Materialia, 40 (7): 1475–1485, doi:10.1016/0956-7151(92)90091-R.
- Almgren, Fred; Taylor, Jean E.; Wang, Lihe (1993), "Curvature-driven flows: a variational approach", SIAM Journal on Control and Optimization, 31 (2): 387–438, doi:10.1137/0331020, MR 1205983.
- Cahn, J. W.; Taylor, J. E. (1994), "Overview No. 113. Surface motion by surface diffusion", Acta Metallurgica et Materialia, 42 (4): 1045–1053, doi:10.1016/0956-7151(94)90123-6.
- Taylor, Jean E. (2003), "Some mathematical challenges in materials science", Bulletin of the American Mathematical Society, 40 (1): 69–87, doi:10.1090/s0273-0979-02-00967-9, MR 1943134.
- Taylor, Jean E. (2006), "Soap bubbles and crystals", Resonance, 11 (6): 26–30, doi:10.1007/BF02838879, S2CID 122133930.
