= Antoine Song =

French mathematician

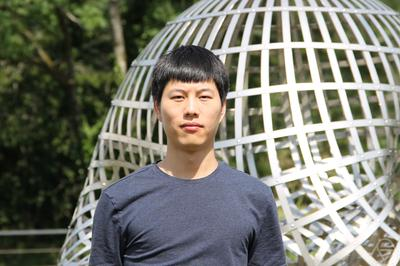
- Born: July 18, 1992 (age 34)
- Education: Princeton University (PhD); Université Pierre et Marie Curie (BS and MS); École Normale Supérieure de Paris
- Known for: Yau's conjecture Huisken–Ilmanen conjecture Equidistribution of minimal hypersurfaces Talagrand's convexity conjecture
- Scientific career
- Fields: Differential geometry Geometric analysis
- Workplaces: Caltech
- Thesis: In search of minimal hypersurfaces (2019)
- Doctoral advisor: Fernando Codá Marques
- Website: sites.google.com/view/antoinesong/home

Antoine Y. Song (born 18 July 1992 in Paris) is a French mathematician whose research concerns differential geometry and geometric analysis. He is a professor at Caltech. In 2018, he proved Yau's conjecture. He holds the Alexzandria Figueroa & Robert Penner Chair for invited researchers at the Institut des Hautes Études Scientifiques.

== Contributions to mathematics ==
It is known that any closed surface possesses infinitely many closed geodesics. The first problem in the minimal submanifolds section of Yau's list (Yau's conjecture) asks whether any closed three-manifold has infinitely many closed smooth immersed minimal surfaces. At the time it was known from Almgren–Pitts min-max theory the existence of at least one minimal surface. Kei Irie, Fernando Codá Marques, and André Neves solved this problem in the generic case and later Song proved it in full generality.

Together with Conghan Dong, he proved a conjecture from 2001 by G. Huisken and T. Ilmanen on the mathematics of general relativity, about the curvature in spaces with very little mass.

== Education ==
Antoine Song was a student at the École Normale Supérieure de Paris from 2012 to 2015. He obtained a bachelor's and a master's degree in mathematics from the Université Pierre et Marie Curie (Paris 6). He obtained his Ph.D. from Princeton University in 2019 under the supervision of Fernando Codá Marques, with the thesis In search of minimal hypersurfaces.

== Honours and awards ==
He was a Clay Research Fellow (2019–2024).

He is a Sloan Fellow.

He delivered the 2021–2022 Peccot Lectures (in 2022, due to the coronavirus pandemic).

In 2024, he received the Frontiers of Science Award.

== Selected publications ==
- Song, Antoine (2023). "Existence of infinitely many minimal hypersurfaces in closed manifolds". Annals of Mathematics. Second Series. 197 (3). arXiv:1806.08816. doi:10.4007/annals.2023.197.3.1. MR 4564260. Zbl 1526.53013.
- Marques, Fernando C.; Neves, André; Song, Antoine (2019). "Equidistribution of minimal hypersurfaces for generic metrics". Inventiones Mathematicae. 216 (2): 421–443. arXiv:1712.06238. Bibcode:2019InMat.216..421M. doi:10.1007/s00222-018-00850-5.
- Dong, Conghan; Song, Antoine (2025). "Stability of Euclidean 3-space for the positive mass theorem". Inventiones Mathematicae. 239 (1): 287. arXiv:2302.07414. Bibcode:2025InMat.239..287D. doi:10.1007/s00222-024-01302-z.
