= Harold Parks =

Harold Parks may refer to:

- George Edwards (actor), born Harold Parks
- Harold R. Parks, mathematician
