= Almgren's isomorphism theorem =

Almgren isomorphism theorem is a result in geometric measure theory and algebraic topology about the topology of the space of flat cycles in a Riemannian manifold.

The theorem plays a fundamental role in the Almgren–Pitts min-max theory as it establishes existence of topologically non-trivial families of cycles, which were used by Frederick J. Almgren Jr., Jon T. Pitts and others to prove existence of (possibly singular) minimal submanifolds in every Riemannian manifold. In the special case of the space of null-homologous codimension 1 cycles with mod 2 coefficients on a closed Riemannian manifold Almgren isomorphism theorem implies that it is weakly homotopy equivalent to the infinite real projective space.

== Statement of the theorem ==
Let M be a Riemannian manifold. Almgren isomorphism theorem asserts that the m-th homotopy group of the space of flat k-dimensional cycles in M is isomorphic to the (m+k)-th dimensional homology group of M. This result is a generalization of the Dold–Thom theorem, which can be thought of as the k=0 case of Almgren's (1962a (ver. PhD thesis),1962b (ver. Topology (Elsevier)) theorem. The isomorphism is defined as follows. Let G be an abelian group and $Z_k(M;G)$ denote the space of flat cycles with coefficients in group G. To each family of cycles $f: S^m \rightarrow Z_k(M;G)$ we associate an (m+k)-cycle C as follows. Fix a fine triangulation T of $S^m$. To each vertex v in the 0-skeletion of T we associate a cycle f(v). To each edge E in the 1-skeleton of T with ∂E=v-w we associate a (k+1)-chain with boundary f(v)-f(w) of minimal mass. We proceed this way by induction over the skeleton of T. The sum of all chains corresponding to m-dimensional faces of T will be the desired (m+k)-cycle C. Even though the choices of triangulation and minimal mass fillings were not unique, they all result in an (m+k)-cycle in the same homology class.
