= Quasi-fibration =

Concept from mathematics

In algebraic topology, a quasifibration is a generalisation of fibre bundles and fibrations introduced by Albrecht Dold and René Thom. Roughly speaking, it is a continuous map p: E → B having the same behaviour as a fibration regarding the (relative) homotopy groups of E, B and p^{−1}(x). Equivalently, one can define a quasifibration to be a continuous map such that the inclusion of each fibre into its homotopy fibre is a weak equivalence. One of the main applications of quasifibrations lies in proving the Dold-Thom theorem.

== Definition ==
A continuous surjective map of topological spaces p: E → B is called a quasifibration if it induces isomorphisms

$$p_*\colon \pi_i(E,p^{-1}(x),y) \to \pi_i(B,x)$$

for all x ∈ B, y ∈ p^{−1}(x) and i ≥ 0. For i = 0,1 one can only speak of bijections between the two sets.

By definition, quasifibrations share a key property of fibrations, namely that a quasifibration p: E → B induces a long exact sequence of homotopy groups

$$\begin{align}
\dots\to \pi_{i+1}(B,x)\to \pi_i(p^{-1}(x),y)\to \pi_i(E,y)&\to \pi_i(B,x)\to \dots \\
&\to \pi_0(B,x)\to 0
\end{align}$$

as follows directly from the long exact sequence for the pair (E, p^{−1}(x)).

This long exact sequence is also functorial in the following sense: Any fibrewise map f: E → E′ induces a morphism between the exact sequences of the pairs (E, p^{−1}(x)) and (E′, p′^{−1}(x)) and therefore a morphism between the exact sequences of a quasifibration. Hence, the diagram

commutes with f_{0} being the restriction of f to p^{−1}(x) and x′ being an element of the form p′(f(e)) for an e ∈ p^{−1}(x).

An equivalent definition is saying that a surjective map p: E → B is a quasifibration if the inclusion of the fibre p^{−1}(b) into the homotopy fibre F_{b} of p over b is a weak equivalence for all b ∈ B. To see this, recall that F_{b} is the fibre of q under b where q: E_{p} → B is the usual path fibration construction. Thus, one has

$$E_p=\{(e,\gamma)\in E\times B^I:\gamma(0)=p(e)\}$$

and q is given by q(e, γ) = γ(1). Now consider the natural homotopy equivalence φ : E → E_{p}, given by φ(e) = (e, p(e)), where p(e) denotes the corresponding constant path. By definition, p factors through E_{p} such that one gets a commutative diagram

Applying π_{n} yields the alternative definition.

== Examples ==
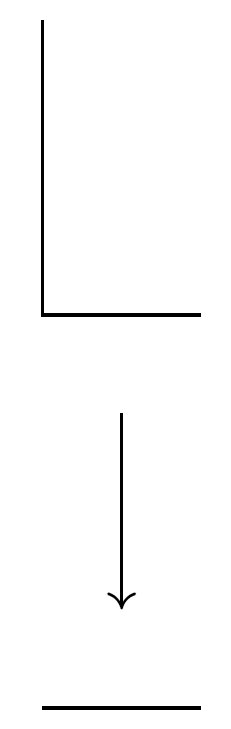

- Every Serre fibration is a quasifibration. This follows from the Homotopy lifting property.
- The projection of the letter L onto its base interval is a quasifibration, but not a fibration. More generally, the projection M_{f} → I of the mapping cylinder of a map f: X → Y between connected CW complexes onto the unit interval is a quasifibration if and only if π_{i}(M_{f}, p^{−1}(b)) = 0 = π_{i}(I, b) holds for all i ∈ I and b ∈ B. But by the long exact sequence of the pair (M_{f}, p^{−1}(b)) and by Whitehead's theorem, this is equivalent to f being a homotopy equivalence. For topological spaces X and Y in general, it is equivalent to f being a weak homotopy equivalence. Furthermore, if f is not surjective, non-constant paths in I starting at 0 cannot be lifted to paths starting at a point of Y outside the image of f in M_{f}. This means that the projection is not a fibration in this case.
- The map SP(p) : SP(X) → SP(X/A) induced by the projection p: X → X/A is a quasifibration for a CW pair (X, A) consisting of two connected spaces. This is one of the main statements used in the proof of the Dold-Thom theorem. In general, this map also fails to be a fibration.

== Properties ==
The following is a direct consequence of the alternative definition of a fibration using the homotopy fibre:

Theorem. Every quasifibration p: E → B factors through a fibration whose fibres are weakly homotopy equivalent to the ones of p.

A corollary of this theorem is that all fibres of a quasifibration are weakly homotopy equivalent if the base space is path-connected, as this is the case for fibrations.

Checking whether a given map is a quasifibration tends to be quite tedious. The following two theorems are designed to make this problem easier. They will make use of the following notion: Let p: E → B be a continuous map. A subset U ⊂ p(E) is called distinguished (with respect to p) if p: p^{−1}(U) → U is a quasifibration.

Theorem. If the open subsets U,V and U ∩ V are distinguished with respect to the continuous map p: E → B, then so is U ∪ V.

Theorem. Let p: E → B be a continuous map where B is the inductive limit of a sequence B_{1} ⊂ B_{2} ⊂ ... All B_{n} are moreover assumed to satisfy the first separation axiom. If all the B_{n} are distinguished, then p is a quasifibration.

To see that the latter statement holds, one only needs to bear in mind that continuous images of compact sets in B already lie in some B_{n}. That way, one can reduce it to the case where the assertion is known. These two theorems mean that it suffices to show that a given map is a quasifibration on certain subsets. Then one can patch these together in order to see that it holds on bigger subsets and finally, using a limiting argument, one sees that the map is a quasifibration on the whole space. This procedure has e.g. been used in the proof of the Dold-Thom theorem.
