= Hidehiko Yamabe =

Japanese mathematician

- Born: August 22, 1923; Ashiya, Hyōgo
- Died: November 20, 1960 (aged 37); Evanston, Illinois
- Education: University of Tokyo
- Known for: Hilbert's fifth problem, Yamabe flow, Yamabe invariant, Yamabe problem
- Scientific career
- Fields: Differential geometry, Group theory
- Workplaces: Osaka University, Princeton University, University of Minnesota, Northwestern University
- Doctoral advisor: Shokichi Iyanaga

Hidehiko Yamabe (山辺 英彦, Yamabe Hidehiko; August 22, 1923, in Ashiya, Hyōgo, Japan – November 20, 1960, in Evanston, Illinois) was a Japanese mathematician. Above all, he is famous for discovering that every conformal class on a smooth compact manifold is represented by a Riemannian metric of constant scalar curvature. Other notable contributions include his definitive solution of Hilbert's fifth problem.

== Life ==
Hidehiko Yamabe was born on August 22, 1923, in the city of Ashiya, belonging to the Hyōgo Prefecture, the sixth son of Takehiko and Rei Yamabe. After completing the Senior High School in September 1944, he joined Tokyo University as a student of the Department of Mathematics and graduated in September 1947: his doctoral advisor was Shokichi Iyanaga. He was then associated with the Department of Mathematics at Osaka University until June 1956, even while employed by the Department of Mathematics at Princeton University in Princeton, New Jersey. Shortly before coming to the United States of America, Yamabe married his wife Etsuko, and by 1956 they had two daughters. Yamabe died suddenly of a stroke in November 1960, just months after accepting a full professorship at Northwestern University.

=== Academic career ===
After graduating from the University of Tokyo in 1947, Yamabe became an assistant at Osaka University. From 1952 until 1954 he was an assistant at Princeton University, receiving his Ph.D. from Osaka University while at Princeton. He left Princeton in 1954 to become assistant professor at the University of Minnesota. Except for one year as a professor at Osaka University, he stayed in Minnesota until 1960. Yamabe died suddenly of a stroke in November 1960, just months after accepting a full professorship at Northwestern University.

=== The Yamabe Memorial Lecture and the Yamabe Symposium ===
After coming back to Japan, Etsuko Yamabe and her daughters lived with the benefits of Hidehiko's social security and of funds raised privately by her and her husband's friends in the United States of America. When she had achieved some financial stability, it was her wish to return the kindness shown to her in a time of great need by setting up funds for an annual lecture, to be alternatively held at Northwestern and Minnesota: the Yamabe Memorial Lecture was so established, and was able to attract distinguished lecturers as Eugenio Calabi. Further funding permitted the expansion of the lecture to the present state bi-annual Yamabe Symposium.

== Work ==
=== Research activity ===
Yamabe published eighteen papers on various mathematical topics:. These have been collected and published as a book, edited by Ralph Philip Boas, Jr. for Gordon and Breach Science Publishers.

Half of Yamabe's papers concern the theory of Lie groups and related topics. However, he is best known today for his remarkable posthumous paper, "On a deformation of Riemannian structures on compact manifolds," Osaka Math. J. 12 (1960) 21–37. This paper claims to prove that any Riemannian metric on any compact manifold without boundary is conformal to another metric for which the scalar curvature is constant. This assertion, which naturally generalizes the uniformization of Riemann surfaces to arbitrary dimensions, is completely correct, as is the broad outline of Yamabe's proof. However, Yamabe's argument contains a subtle analytic mistake arising form the failure of certain natural inclusions of Sobolev spaces to be compact. This mistake was only corrected in stages, on a case-by-case basis, first by Trudinger ("Remarks Concerning the Conformal Deformation of Metrics to Constant Scalar Curvature", Ann. Scuola Norm. Sup. Pisa 22 (1968) 265–274), then by Aubin (Équations Différentielles Non Linéaires et Problème de Yamabe, J. Math. Pures Appl. 9: 55 (1976) 269–296), and finally, in full generality, by Schoen ("Conformal Deformation of a Riemannian Metric to Constant Scalar Curvature," Journal of Differential Geometry 20 (1984) 478-495). Yamabe's visionary paper thereby became a cornerstone of modern Riemannnian geometry, and is thus largely responsible for his posthumous fame. For example, as of January 16, 2015, MathSciNet records 186 citations of Yamabe's 1960 paper in the Osaka Journal, compared with only 148 citations of all of his other publications combined. As of January 16, 2015, MathSciNet also lists 997 reviews containing the word "Yamabe." This, of course, is notably larger than the number of papers that explicitly cite any of Yamabe's articles. However, the vast majority of these reviews contain one of the phrases "scalar curvature" or "Yamabe equation," referring to Yamabe's equation governing the behavior of the scalar curvature under conformal rescaling. In this sense, the influence of Yamabe's 1960 paper in the Osaka Journal has become such a universal fixture of current mathematical thought that it is often implicitly referred to without an explicit citation.

== Publications ==
- Boas, R. P., ed. (1967), Collected works of Hidehiko Yamabe, Notes on Mathematics and its Applications, New York–London–Paris: Gordon and Breach Science Publishers, pp. XII+142, MR 0223206, Zbl 0153.30502

== See also ==
- Hilbert's fifth problem
- Yamabe flow
- Yamabe invariant
- Yamabe problem
