= Sigma constant =

Sigma constant (σ constant) may refer to:

- Yamabe invariant, in mathematics
- A parameter of the Hammett equation in organic chemistry
- The constant of proportionality in the Stefan-Boltzmann law in physics (also called the Stefan-Boltzmann constant)
