= Fernando Codá Marques =

Brazilian mathematician

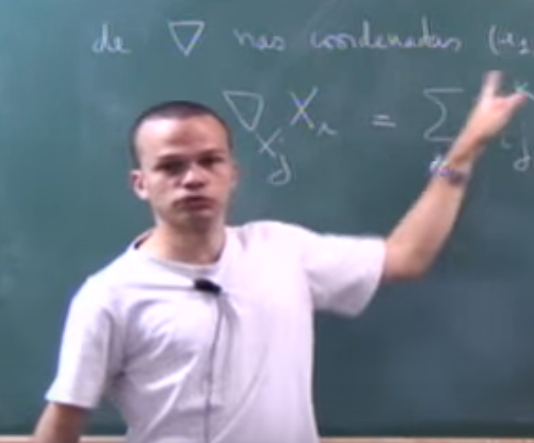
- Born: Fernando Codá dos Santos Cavalcanti Marques; 8 October 1979 (age 47); São Carlos, Brazil
- Education: Cornell University (Ph.D.); IMPA (M.S.); UFAL (B.S.)
- Known for: Willmore conjecture Freedman–He–Wang conjecture Yau's conjecture Contributions to Almgren–Pitts min-max theory Yamabe problem Equidistribution of minimal hypersurfaces Min-Oo conjecture Weyl law for the volume spectrum
- Spouse: Ana Maria Menezes de Jesus
- Children: 2
- Awards: Fermat Prize (2021); Veblen Prize in Geometry (2016); ICTP Ramanujan Prize (2012); TWAS Prize (2012)
- Scientific career
- Fields: Differential geometry; Geometric analysis; Geometric topology
- Workplaces: Princeton University; IMPA
- Thesis: Existence and Compactness Theorems on Conformal Deformation of Metrics (2003)
- Doctoral advisor: José F. Escobar
- Doctoral students: Antoine Song
- Website: www.math.princeton.edu/directory/fernando-coda-marques

Fernando Codá dos Santos Cavalcanti Marques (born in 1979) is a Brazilian mathematician working mainly in geometry, topology, partial differential equations and Morse theory. He is a professor at Princeton University. In 2012, together with André Neves, he proved the Willmore conjecture. Since then, among proving other important conjectures, Marques and Neves greatly extended Almgren–Pitts min-max theory to prove theorems about minimal surfaces.

== Early years, education and career ==
Codá Marques was born on 8 October 1979 in São Carlos and grew up in Maceió. His parents were both professors of engineering.

Codá Marques started as a student of civil engineering at the Federal University of Alagoas in 1996, but switched to mathematics after two years. He earned a master's degree from the Instituto Nacional de Matemática Pura e Aplicada (IMPA) in 1999. Among his teachers at the IMPA were Manfredo do Carmo and Elon Lages Lima.

Following the advice of Manfredo do Carmo, Codá Marques went to Cornell University to learn geometric analysis from José F. Escobar, so that he could return and bring this area of research to Brazil. While still in Brazil, Codá Marques had been informed that Escobar was facing cancer and that he could maybe die before Codá Marques could complete his Ph.D. with him. Despite this information, Codá Marques decided to keep the arrangement and became his student.

In 2001, Codá Marques was awarded Cornell's Battig Prize for graduate students, for "excellence and promise in mathematics". He obtained his Ph.D. from Cornell University in 2003, under the supervision of José F. Escobar (thesis: Existence and Compactness Theorems on Conformal Deformation of Metrics). Despite the usual path being to go for a postdoctoral research, Marques had in mind that his mission was to return to Brazil. IMPA had already offered him a position of researcher, and he accepted it. But after six months in Brazil, Escobar, who was his main connection with researchers outside of Brazil, died. Codá Marques faced the difficulties of doing research in isolation, so he decided to accept an invitation to stay one year as a postdoc at Stanford University. There he was influenced by Richard Schoen's school of thought in geometry and met André Neves (who would become his main collaborator), and many other of his contacts.

Codá Marques worked at IMPA from 2003 to 2014. On 1 September 2014, Codá Marques joined Princeton University as a full professor.

One of his PhD students at Princeton was Antoine Song.

== Mathematical work ==
Some of his best known works are the following:

=== Yamabe problem ===
In 2009, together with Richard Schoen and Marcus Khuri he did important work on the Yamabe problem. He solved Schoen's conjecture on compactness in the Yamabe problem for spin manifolds.

=== Rigidity conjecture of Min-Oo ===
In April 2010, in cooperation with Simon Brendle and André Neves, Marques provided a counter-example to the rigidity conjecture of Min-Oo, proposed by Maung Min-Oo in 1995.

=== Willmore conjecture ===
A preprint by Codá Marques and Neves "Min-max theory and the Willmore conjecture", was uploaded to arXiv in February 2012. In it, they solved the Willmore conjecture, using Almgren–Pitts min-max theory, which was then "a relatively old tool and already somewhat out of favor". According to Harold Rosenberg, using this tool was possible because the pair discovered a connection between objects that were apparently very different: "connecting the problem with questions about minimal surfaces on the sphere [...] a priori there would be no reason for these things to be connected. It's curious, very curious.", the solution to the Willmore conjecture (Willmore, 1965)

=== Freedman–He–Wang conjecture ===
In May 2012, in cooperation with Ian Agol and André Neves, Marques provided the solution to the Freedman–He–Wang conjecture (Freedman–He–Wang, 1994)

=== Weyl law for the volume spectrum ===
In 2016, together with Yevgeny Liokumovich and André Neves, he solved a conjecture of Mikhael Gromov on a Weyl law for the volume spectrum in compact Riemannian manifolds.

=== Yau's conjecture ===
In December 2017, in cooperation with Kei Irie and André Neves, he solved Yau's conjecture (Yau, 1982) in the generic case. The conjecture was later fully solved by Antoine Song building on their work.

=== Almgren–Pitts min-max theory ===
Codá Marques and André Neves are currently working to extend Almgren–Pitts min-max theory.

== Honours ==
Codá Marques was an invited speaker at the International Congress of Mathematicians (ICM) of 2010 in Hyderabad (on "Scalar curvature, conformal geometry, and the Ricci flow with surgery"), and a plenary speaker at the ICM of 2014 in Seoul (on "Minimal surfaces – variational theory and applications").

Codá Marques received the TWAS Prize in 2012.

Codá Marques was awarded the ICTP Ramanujan Prize in 2012, "in recognition of his several outstanding contributions to differential geometry".

In 2014, he gave the Łojasiewicz Lecture (on "The min-max theory of minimal surfaces and applications") at the Jagiellonian University in Kraków. He is a full member of the Brazilian Academy of Sciences since 2014.

Codá Marques shared the 2016 Oswald Veblen Prize in Geometry with André Neves, "for their remarkable work on variational problems in differential geometry [including] the proof of the Willmore conjecture.". He was elected to the 2018 class of fellows of the American Mathematical Society.

Codá Marques is a distinguished visiting professor of mathematics at the Institute for Advanced Study. He sits on the editorial board of the journal Annals of Mathematics.

In 2020, he received a Simons Investigator Award. The citation reads: "His recent work, in collaboration with André Neves, developed a full Morse theory for the area functional in closed Riemannian manifolds. The ideas introduced by them have revitalized the subject, leading to the discovery that closed minimal surfaces are ubiquitous in these spaces."

He delivered the 2021 Euler Lecture.

In 2021, he was awarded the Fermat Prize, "for major advances obtained with André Neves on geometric applications of the calculus of variations".

In 2023, he received the Frontiers of Science Award.

== Personal life ==
He is married to mathematician Ana Maria Menezes de Jesus. She was a student of Harold Rosenberg at IMPA, and is currently a research scholar of mathematics at Princeton University. Codá Marques and Menezes have two children, a son and a daughter.
