= José Escobar =

José Escobar may refer to:

- José Escobar (baseball) (born 1960), former Major League Baseball shortstop
- José Escobar Saliente (1908–1994), Spanish comic writer and artist, creator of Zipi y Zape
- José Bernardo Escobar (1797–1849), interim president of Guatemala
- José F. Escobar (1954–2004), Colombian mathematician
- José Gonzalo Escobar (1892–1969), officer in the Mexican Army
- José Escobar (athlete), Ecuadorian javelin thrower
- José Escobar (wrestler) (born 1975), Colombian wrestler
