= Almgren–Pitts min-max theory =

In mathematics, the Almgren–Pitts min-max theory (named after Frederick J. Almgren, Jr. and his student Jon T. Pitts) is an analogue of Morse theory for hypersurfaces. It is a collection of global variational methods for constructing critical points of functionals.

The theory started with the efforts for generalizing George David Birkhoff's method (Birkhoff's minimax principle) for the construction of simple closed geodesics on the sphere, to allow the construction of embedded minimal surfaces in arbitrary 3-manifolds.

It has played roles in the solutions to a number of conjectures in geometry and topology found by Almgren and Pitts themselves and also by other mathematicians, such as Mikhail Gromov, Richard Schoen, Shing-Tung Yau, Fernando Codá Marques, André Neves, Ian Agol, among others.

== Description and basic concepts ==
The theory allows the construction of embedded minimal hypersurfaces through variational methods.

In his PhD thesis, Almgren proved that the m-th homotopy group of the space of flat k-dimensional cycles on a closed Riemannian manifold is isomorphic to the (m+k)-th dimensional homology group of M. This result is a generalization of the Dold–Thom theorem, which can be thought of as the k=0 case of Almgren's theorem. Existence of non-trivial homotopy classes in the space of cycles suggests the possibility of constructing minimal submanifolds as saddle points of the volume function, as in Morse theory. In his subsequent work Almgren used these ideas to prove that for every k=1,...,n-1 a closed n-dimensional Riemannian manifold contains a stationary integral k-dimensional varifold, a generalization of minimal submanifold that may have singularities. Allard showed that such generalized minimal submanifolds are regular on an open and dense subset.

In the 1980s Almgren's student Jon Pitts greatly improved the regularity theory of minimal submanifolds obtained by Almgren in the case of codimension 1. He showed that when the dimension n of the manifold is between 3 and 6 the minimal hypersurface obtained using Almgren's min-max method is smooth. A key new idea in the proof was the notion of 1/j-almost minimizing varifolds. Richard Schoen and Leon Simon extended this result to higher dimensions. More specifically, they showed that every n-dimensional Riemannian manifold contains a closed minimal hypersurface constructed via min-max method that is smooth away from a closed set of dimension n-8.

By considering higher parameter families of codimension 1 cycles one can find distinct minimal hypersurfaces. Such construction was used by Fernando Codá Marques and André Neves in their proof of the Willmore conjecture.

== See also ==
- Almgren isomorphism theorem
- Varifold
- Geometric measure theory
- Geometric analysis
- Minimal surface
- Freedman–He–Wang conjecture
- Willmore conjecture
- Yau's conjecture
- Global analysis
