= José F. Escobar =

Colombian mathematician (born 1954)

- Born: December 20, 1954; Manizales, Colombia
- Died: January 3, 2004 (aged 49)
- Education: University of California, Berkeley (Ph.D.); IMPA (M.S.); University of Valle (B.S.)
- Known for: Boundary Yamabe problem
- Awards: Presidential Faculty Fellowship (1992)
- Scientific career
- Fields: Differential geometry Partial differential equations
- Institutions: Cornell University
- Doctoral advisor: Richard Schoen
- Doctoral students: Fernando Codá Marques

José Fernando "Chepe" Escobar (born 20 December 1954, in Manizales, Colombia) was a Colombian mathematician known for his work on differential geometry and partial differential equations. He was a professor at Cornell University. He contributed to the solution of the Yamabe problem on manifolds with boundary.

== Education and career ==
He completed his mathematical undergraduate program at Universidad del Valle, Colombia. He received a scholarship that permitted him to do a master in science studies at the Instituto Nacional de Matemática Pura e Aplicada (IMPA) in Rio de Janeiro, Brazil.

Escobar obtained his Ph.D. from the University of California, Berkeley in 1986, under the supervision of Richard Schoen. In his thesis he solved the problem known as the "boundary Yamabe problem", that had been previously settled only for the case of manifolds without boundary.

He died from cancer on 3 January 2004, at the age 49.

Mathematician Fernando Codá Marques was a Ph.D. student of his.

== Recognition ==
Among the awards he received for his work are the Alfred P. Sloan Doctoral Dissertation Fellowship (1985-86) and the Presidential Faculty Fellowship (1992).

In 2016, the Colombian Mathematical Society established the Premio José Fernando Escobar for investigation in mathematics.

== Selected publications ==
=== Research articles ===
- "The Yamabe problem on manifolds with boundary", Journal of Differential Geometry, 1992. https://doi.org/10.4310/jdg/1214447805
- "Conformal deformation of a Riemannian metric to a scalar flat metric with constant mean curvature on the boundary", Annals of Mathematics, 1992. https://doi.org/10.2307/2946545
- with Richard M. Schoen: "Conformal metrics with prescribed scalar curvature", Inventiones mathematicae, 1986. https://doi.org/10.1007/BF01389071
- "Sharp constant in a Sobolev trace inequality", Indiana University Mathematics Journal, 1988. https://www.jstor.org/stable/24895334
- "Uniqueness theorems on conformal deformation of metrics, Sobolev inequalities, and an eigenvalue estimate", Communications on Pure and Applied Mathematics, 1990. https://doi.org/10.1002/cpa.3160430703

=== Books ===
- Topics in PDEs̕ and Differential Geometry, Universidade Federal de Goiânia, 2002
- Some Variational Problems in Geometry, Instituto Nacional de Matemática Pura e Aplicada, 2000
