= Vincent Moncrief =

American mathematical physicist

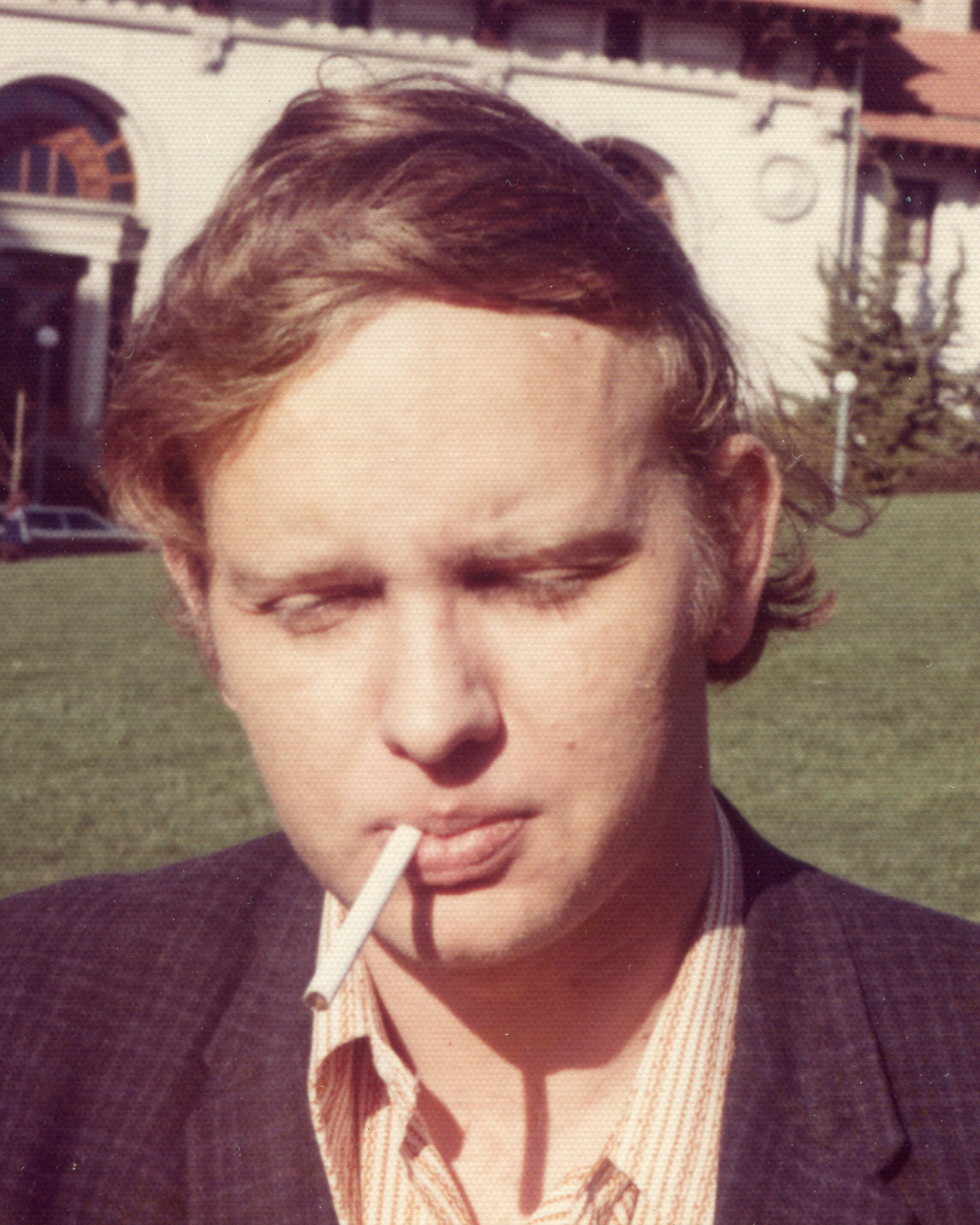
- Moncrief in 1973
- Citizenship: American
- Education: Stanford University (B.S., 1965); University of Maryland, College Park (Ph.D., 1972)
- Known for: Gauge-invariant black hole perturbation theory Global existence of Yang–Mills fields (with Eardley); Hamiltonian reduction of Einstein's equations Fischer–Moncrief reduced Hamiltonian and the Yamabe invariant
- Scientific career
- Fields: Mathematical physics, general relativity
- Workplaces: Yale University; University of Utah; University of California, Berkeley
- Thesis: Partially Covariant Quantum Theory of Gravitation (1972)
- Doctoral advisor: Charles William Misner
- Doctoral students: Edward Seidel

Vincent Edward Moncrief is an American mathematical physicist at Yale University, where he is Professor of Physics and of Mathematics. His research centers on general relativity, particularly the global existence and asymptotic behavior of solutions to Einstein's equations, cosmic censorship, and black hole stability.

== Education and career ==
Moncrief grew up in Oklahoma City. He received his B.S. in physics from Stanford University in 1965 and his Ph.D. in physics from the University of Maryland, College Park in 1972, under the supervision of Charles William Misner. His doctoral dissertation was titled Partially Covariant Quantum Theory of Gravitation. He subsequently held positions at the University of California, Berkeley and the University of Utah before joining Yale.

== Research ==
=== Black hole perturbation theory ===
In a series of papers in the mid-1970s, Moncrief developed a gauge-invariant Hamiltonian approach to gravitational perturbation theory for black holes. He decomposed metric perturbations into gauge-invariant and gauge-dependent parts and used the resulting Hamiltonian to establish the stability of both Schwarzschild and Reissner–Nordström black holes.

=== Global existence of Yang–Mills fields ===
With Douglas Eardley, Moncrief proved the global existence of solutions to the Yang–Mills equations (coupled to a Higgs field) in (3+1)-dimensional Minkowski space, demonstrating that the curvature remains bounded for all time.

=== Hamiltonian reduction and the Yamabe invariant ===
With Arthur Fischer (University of California, Santa Cruz), Moncrief showed that the reduced Hamiltonian for Einstein's equations is related to the Yamabe invariant (sigma constant) of the spatial manifold, and that it is monotonically decreasing along all solutions in the direction of cosmological expansion.

Moncrief also carried out a Hamiltonian reduction of Einstein's equations in 2+1 dimensions, expressing the dynamics as a system over Teichmüller space.

=== Cosmic censorship and the Einstein flow ===
Moncrief's more recent research focuses on the global existence and asymptotic properties of cosmological solutions of Einstein's equations and the question of how these depend on the topology of spacetime. This includes work on Penrose's cosmic censorship conjecture and the study of the "Einstein flow" on various manifolds, including the question of whether the universe could have an exotic spatial topology.

== Recognition ==
A special issue of Classical and Quantum Gravity titled Spacetime Safari: Essays in Honor of Vincent Moncrief on the Classical Physics of Strong Gravitational Fields was published in recognition of his contributions to mathematical relativity.
