= Möbius energy =

Particular knot energy

In mathematics, the Möbius energy of a knot is a particular knot energy, i.e., a functional on the space of knots. It was discovered by Jun O'Hara, who demonstrated that the energy blows up as the knot's strands get close to one another. This is a useful property because it prevents self-intersection and ensures the result under gradient descent is of the same knot type.

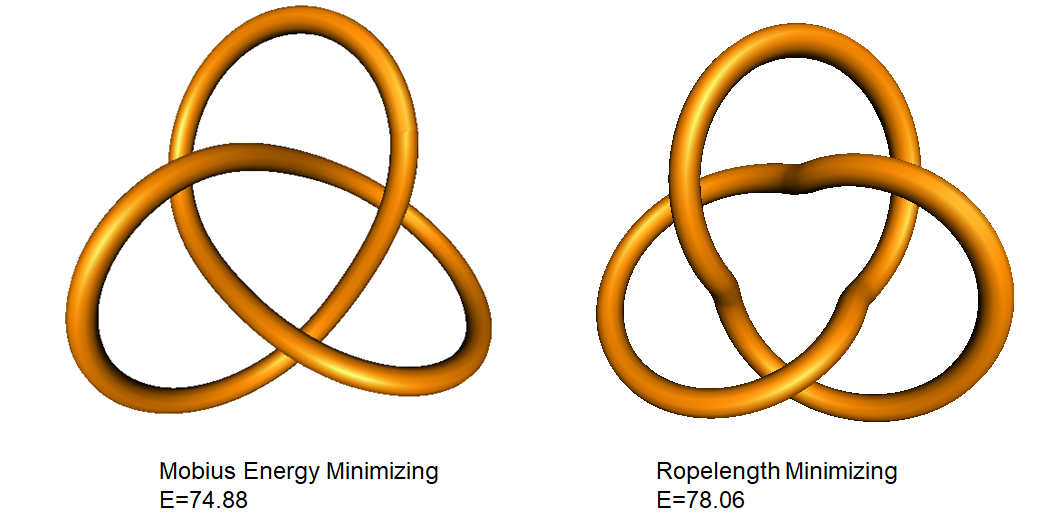
Pictures of two trefoil knots, with different Möbius energies. The knot on the left has a Möbius energy of 74.88, close to the minimum of 74.41. The knot on the right has close to the minimum ropelength, but a higher Möbius energy of 78.06.

Invariance of Möbius energy under Möbius transformations was demonstrated by Michael Freedman, Zheng-Xu He, and Zhenghan Wang (1994) who used it to show the existence of a $C^{1,1}$ energy minimizer in each isotopy class of a prime knot. They also showed the minimum energy of any knot conformation is achieved by a round circle.

Conjecturally, there is no energy minimizer for composite knots. Robert B. Kusner and John M. Sullivan have done computer experiments with a discretized version of the Möbius energy and concluded that there should be no energy minimizer for the knot sum of two trefoils (although this is not a proof).

Recall that the Möbius transformations of the 3-sphere $S^3=\mathbf R^3\cup\infty$ are the ten-dimensional group of angle-preserving diffeomorphisms generated by inversion in 2-spheres. For example, the inversion in the sphere $\{\mathbf v\in\mathbf R^3\colon |\mathbf v-\mathbf a|=\rho\}$ is defined by $\mathbf x\to\mathbf a+{\rho^2\over |\mathbf x-\mathbf a|^2}\cdot(\mathbf x-\mathbf a).$

Consider a rectifiable simple curve $\gamma(u)$ in the Euclidean 3-space $\mathbf R^3$, where $u$ belongs to $\mathbf R^1$ or $S^1$. Define its energy by

$$E(\gamma)=\iint\left\{\frac{1}{|\gamma(u)-\gamma(v)|^2}-
\frac{1}
{D(\gamma(u),\gamma(v))^2}\right\}|\dot{\gamma}(u)||\dot{
\gamma}(v)|\,du\,dv,$$

where $D(\gamma(u),\gamma(v))$ is the shortest arc distance between $\gamma(u)$ and $\gamma(v)$ on the curve. The second term of the integrand is called a regularization. It is easy to see that $E(\gamma)$ is independent of parametrization and is unchanged if $\gamma$ is changed by a similarity of $\mathbf R^3$. Moreover, the energy of any line is 0, the energy of any circle is $4$. In fact, let us use the arc-length parameterization. Denote by $\ell$ the length of the curve $\gamma$. Then

$$E(\gamma)=\int_{-\ell/2}^{\ell/2}{}dx\int_{x-\ell/2}^{x+\ell/2}\left[{1\over|\gamma(x)-\gamma(y)|^2}-{1\over|x-y|^2}\right]dy.$$

Let $\gamma_0(t)=(\cos t, \sin t, 0)$ denote a unit circle. We have

$$|\gamma_0(x)-\gamma_0(y)|^2={\left(2\sin\tfrac12(x-y)\right)^2}$$

and consequently,

$$\begin{align} E(\gamma_0)&=\int_{-\pi}^{\pi}{}dx\int_{x-\pi}^{x+\pi}\left[{1\over \left(2\sin\tfrac12(x-y)\right)^2}-{1\over|x-y|^2}\right]dy\\
&=4\pi\int_{0}^{\pi}\left[{1\over \left(2\sin( y/2)\right)^2}-{1\over|y|^2}\right]dy\\
&=2\pi\int_{0}^{\pi/2}\left[{1\over \sin^2y}-{1\over|y|^2}\right]dy\\
&=2\pi\left[{1\over u}-\cot u\right]_{u=0}^{\pi/2}=4
\end{align}$$

since $\frac1u-\cot u=\frac u3-\cdots$.

== Knot invariant ==
On the left, the unknot, and a knot equivalent to it. It can be more difficult to determine whether complex knots, such as the one on the right, are equivalent to the unknot.

A knot is created by beginning with a one-dimensional line segment, wrapping it around itself arbitrarily, and then fusing its two free ends together to form a closed loop. Mathematically, we can say a knot $K$ is an injective and continuous function $K\colon[0,1]\to \mathbb{R}^3$ with $K(0)=K(1)$. Topologists consider knots and other entanglements such as links and braids to be equivalent if the knot can be pushed about smoothly, without intersecting itself, to coincide with another knot. The idea of knot equivalence is to give a precise definition of when two knots should be considered the same even when positioned quite differently in space. A mathematical definition is that two knots $K_1,K_2$ are equivalent if there is an orientation-preserving homeomorphism $h\colon\R^3\to\R^3$ with $h(K_1)=K_2$, and this is known to be equivalent to existence of ambient isotopy.

The basic problem of knot theory, the recognition problem, is determining the equivalence of two knots. Algorithms exist to solve this problem, with the first given by Wolfgang Haken in the late 1960s. Nonetheless, these algorithms can be extremely time-consuming, and a major issue in the theory is to understand how hard this problem really is. The special case of recognizing the unknot, called the unknotting problem, is of particular interest. We shall picture a knot by a smooth curve rather than by a polygon. A knot will be represented by a planar diagram. The singularities of the planar diagram will be called crossing points and the regions into which it subdivides the plane regions of the diagram. At each crossing point, two of the four corners will be dotted to indicate which branch through the crossing point is to be thought of as one passing under the other. We number any one region at random, but shall fix the numbers of all remaining regions such that whenever we cross the curve from right to left we must pass from region number $k$ to the region number $k+1$. Clearly, at any crossing point $c$, there are two opposite corners of the same number $k$ and two opposite corners of the numbers $k-1$ and $k+1$, respectively. The number $k$ is referred as the index of $c$. The crossing points are distinguished by two types: the right handed and the left handed, according to which branch through the point passes under or behind the other. At any crossing point of index $k$ two dotted corners are of numbers $k$ and $k+1$, respectively, two undotted ones of numbers $k-1$ and $k+1$. The index of any corner of any region of index $k$ is one element of $\{k\pm1,k\}$. We wish to distinguish one type of knot from another by knot invariants. There is one invariant which is quite simple. It is Alexander polynomial $\Delta_K(t)$ with integer coefficient. The Alexander polynomial is symmetric with degree $n$: $\Delta_K(t^{-1})t^{n-1} = \Delta_K(t)$ for all knots $K$ of $n>0$ crossing points. For example, the invariant $\Delta_K(t)$ of an unknotted curve is 1, of an trefoil knot is $t^2-t+1$.

The left handed trefoil knot.

The right handed trefoil knot.

Let

$\omega(\boldsymbol{x})=\frac1{4\pi}\varepsilon_{ijk}{x^idx^j\wedge dx^k\over|\boldsymbol{x}|^3}$ denote the standard surface element of $S^2$.

We have

$$\mathrm {link}(\gamma_1,\gamma_2)=\int_{\boldsymbol{x}\in\gamma_1,\boldsymbol{y}\in\gamma_2}\omega(\boldsymbol{x}-\boldsymbol{y})$$

$$\int_{S^2}\omega(\boldsymbol{x})=\frac1{4\pi}\int_{S^2}\varepsilon_{ijk}x^idx^j dx^k=1,\qquad \omega(\lambda\boldsymbol{x})= \omega(\boldsymbol{x}){\rm {sign}}\lambda, \quad{\rm { for}  }\quad\lambda \in\R^*.$$

For the knot $\gamma: [0,1] \rightarrow \mathbb R^3$, $\gamma(0)=\gamma(1)$,

$$\int_{t_1<t_2<t_3<t_4<1} \omega(\gamma(t_1)-\gamma(t_3))\wedge  \omega(\gamma(t_2)-\gamma(t_4))$$

$$+\int_{t_1<t_2<t_3,\boldsymbol{x}\in\R^3\setminus \gamma([0,1]) } \omega(\gamma(t_1)-\boldsymbol{x})\wedge  \omega(\gamma(t_2)-\boldsymbol{x})\wedge  \omega(\gamma(t_3)-\boldsymbol{x})$$

does not change, if we change the knot $\gamma$ in its equivalence class.

== Möbius Invariance Property ==
Let $\gamma$ be a closed curve in $\R^3$ and $T$ a Möbius transformation of $S^3 = \R^3 \cup \infty$. If $T(\gamma)$ is contained in $\R^3$ then $E(T(\gamma))=E(\gamma)$. If $T(\gamma)$ passes through $\infty$ then $E(T(\gamma)) = E(\gamma)-4$.

Theorem A. Among all rectifiable loops $\gamma \colon S^1 \to \R^3$, round circles have the least energy $E (\text{round circle}) = 4$ and any $\gamma$ of least energy parameterizes a round circle.

Proof of Theorem A. Let $T$ be a Möbius transformation sending a point of $\gamma$ to infinity. The energy $E(T(\gamma))\ge0$ with equality holding if and only if $T(\gamma)$ is a straight line. Apply the Möbius invariance property we complete the proof.

Proof of Möbius Invariance Property. It is sufficient to consider how $I$, an inversion in a sphere, transforms energy. Let $u$ be the arc length parameter of a rectifiable closed curve $\gamma$, $u \in \R / \ell\Z$. Let

$E_\varepsilon(\gamma)=\iint_{|u-v|\ge\varepsilon}\left(\frac{1}{|\gamma(u)-\gamma(v)|^2} - \frac{1}{D(\gamma(u),\gamma(v))^2}\right)\,du\,dv$	1

and

$$\begin{align} E_\varepsilon(I\circ\gamma)=&\iint_{|u-v|\ge\varepsilon} \left(\frac{1}{|I\circ\gamma(u)-I\circ\gamma(v)|^2} -\frac{1}{(D(I\circ\gamma(u),I\circ\gamma(v)))^2}\right)\\ &\qquad\times\|I'(\gamma(u))\|\cdot\|I'(\gamma(v))\|\,du \,dv. \end{align}$$	2

Clearly, $E(\gamma)=\lim_{\varepsilon\to0}E_\varepsilon(\gamma)$ and $E(I\circ\gamma)=\lim_{\varepsilon\to0}E_\varepsilon(I\circ\gamma)$. It is a short calculation (using the law of cosines) that the first terms transform correctly, i.e.,

$$\frac{\|I'(\gamma(u))\|\cdot\|I'(\gamma(v))\|}{|I(
\gamma(u))-I(\gamma(v))|^2}=
\frac{1}{|\gamma(u)-\gamma(v)|^2}.$$

Since $u$ is arclength for $\gamma$, the regularization term of (1) is the elementary integral

$\int_{u=0}^\ell\left[2\int_{v=\varepsilon}^{\ell/2}\frac{1}{v^2}\,dv \right]\,du=4- \frac{2\ell}{\varepsilon}.$	3

Let $s$ be an arclength parameter for $I\circ\gamma$. Then $ds(u)/du=\|I'(\gamma(u))\|$ where $\|I'(\gamma(u))\|=f(u)$ denotes the linear expansion factor of $I'$. Since $\gamma(u)$ is a Lipschitz function and $I'$ is smooth, $f(u)$ is Lipschitz, hence, it has weak derivative $f'(u)\in L^\infty$.

$$\begin{align} \rm{regularization } (2)=&\int_{u\in\mathbf R/\ell\mathbf Z}\left[\int_{|v-u|\ge\varepsilon}\frac{|(I\circ\gamma)'(v)|\,dv} {D(I\circ\gamma(u),I\circ\gamma(v))^2}\right]|(I\circ \gamma)'(u)|\,du\\ =&\int_{\mathbf R/\ell\mathbf Z}\left[\frac{4}{L}-\frac{1}{\varepsilon_+ }-\frac{1}{\varepsilon_-} \right]\,ds, \end{align}$$	4

where $L=\rm{Length}(I(\gamma))$ and

$$\begin{align}
\varepsilon_+&=\varepsilon_+(u)=D((I\circ\gamma)(u),(I\circ\gamma)
(u+\varepsilon))=s(u+\varepsilon)-s(u)\\
&=\int_u^{u+\varepsilon}f(w)\,dw
=f(u)\varepsilon+\varepsilon^2\int_0^1(1-t)f'(u+\varepsilon t)\,dt\end{align}$$

and

$$\varepsilon_-=\varepsilon_-(u)=D((I\circ\gamma)(u-\varepsilon),(I\circ\gamma)(u))
=f(u)\varepsilon-\varepsilon^2\int_0^1(1-t)f'(u-\varepsilon t)\,dt.$$

Since $|f'(w)|$ is uniformly bounded, we have

$$\begin{align}
\frac{1}{\varepsilon_+}=&\frac{1}{f(u)\varepsilon}\left[{1+
{\varepsilon \over f(u)}
\int_0^1(1-t)f'(u+\varepsilon t)\,dt}\right]^{-1}\\
=&\frac{1}{f(u)\varepsilon}\left[1-\frac{\varepsilon}{f(u)}
\int_0^1(1-t)f'(u+\varepsilon t)\,dt+
O(\varepsilon^2)\right]\\
=&\frac{1}{f(u)\varepsilon}-\frac{1}{f(u)^2}\int_0^1(1-t)f'(u+
\varepsilon t)\,dt+
O(\varepsilon).
\end{align}$$

Similarly, $\frac{1}{\varepsilon_-}=\frac{1}{f(u)\varepsilon}+ \frac{1}{f(u)^2}\int_0^1(1-t)f'(u-\varepsilon t)\,dt+ O(\varepsilon).$

Then by (4)

$$\begin{align} \rm{regularization}\ (2)=&4-\int_0^\ell\frac{2}{\varepsilon}\,du+ O(\varepsilon)\\ &+\int_{u=0}^\ell\int_{t=0}^1\frac{(1-t)}{f(u)}[f'(u+\varepsilon t)-f'(u- \varepsilon t)]\,du\,dt\\ =&4-\frac{2\ell}{\varepsilon}+ O(\varepsilon). \end{align}$$	5

Comparing (3) and (5), we get $E_\varepsilon(\gamma)-E_\varepsilon(I\circ\gamma)= O(\varepsilon);$ hence, $E(\gamma)=E(I\circ\gamma)$.

For the second assertion, let $I$ send a point of $\gamma$ to infinity. In this case $L=\infty$ and, thus, the constant term 4 in (5) disappears.

== Freedman–He–Wang conjecture ==
The Freedman–He–Wang conjecture (1994) stated that the Möbius energy of nontrivial links in $\mathbb R^3$ is minimized by the stereographic projection of the standard Hopf link. This was proved in 2012 by Ian Agol, Fernando C. Marques and André Neves, by using Almgren–Pitts min-max theory. Let $\gamma_i: S^1 \rightarrow \mathbb R^3$, $i=1,2,$ be a link of 2 components, i.e., a pair of rectifiable closed curves in Euclidean three-space with $\gamma_1(S^1) \cap \gamma_2(S^1) = \emptyset$. The Möbius cross energy of the link $(\gamma_1,\gamma_2)$ is defined to be

$$E(\gamma_1,\gamma_2) = \int_{S^1 \times S^1} \frac{|\dot\gamma_1(s)||\dot\gamma_2(t)|}{|\gamma_1(s)-\gamma_2(t)|^2}\, ds\, dt.$$

The linking number of $(\gamma_1,\gamma_2)$ is defined by letting

$$\begin{align}
\mathrm {link}(\gamma_1,\gamma_2) &=\,\frac{1}{4\pi}
\oint_{\gamma_1}\oint_{\gamma_2}
\frac{\mathbf{r}_1 - \mathbf{r}_2}{|\mathbf{r}_1 - \mathbf{r}_2|^3}
\cdot (d\mathbf{r}_1 \times d\mathbf{r}_2)\\
&= \frac{1}{4\pi}\int_{S^1 \times S^1} \frac{\mathrm {det}(\dot\gamma_1(s),\dot\gamma_2(t),\gamma_1(s)-\gamma_2(t))}{|\gamma_1(s)-\gamma_2(t)|^3}\, ds \, dt.\end{align}$$

$\cdots$
	linking number −2	linking number −1	linking number 0
					$\cdots$
		linking number 1	linking number 2	linking number 3

The numerator of the linking integrand contains a factor of the displacement between two line elements that reduces the cubic distance dependence to a square, similar to the Möbius energy integrand. The linking integrand will be reduced by the dot product of the displacement vector with the cross product of the two tangent vectors of those line elements, which may be unitary at a few locations but is typically less than one. For that reason, $E(\gamma_1,\gamma_2)\geq 4\pi |{\rm link}(\gamma_1,\gamma_2)|$. If two circles are unlinked and very far from each other, the cross energy can be made arbitrarily small but nonzero. If the linking number $\mathrm {link}(\gamma_1,\gamma_2)$ is non-zero, the link is called non-split and for the non-split link, $E(\gamma_1,\gamma_2)\geq 4\pi$. So we are interested in the minimal energy of non-split links. Note that the definition of the energy extends to any 2-component link in $\mathbb R^n$. The Möbius energy has the remarkable property of being invariant under conformal transformations of $\mathbb R^3$. This property is explained as follows. Let $F:\mathbb R^3 \rightarrow {S^3}$ denote a conformal map. Then $E(\gamma_1,\gamma_2) = E(F\circ \gamma_1,F\circ \gamma_2).$ This condition is called the conformal invariance property of the Möbius cross energy.

Main Theorem. Let $\gamma_i: S^1 \rightarrow \mathbb R^3$, $i=1,2,$ be a non-split link of 2 components link. Then $E(\gamma_1,\gamma_2) \geq 2\pi^2$. Moreover, if $E(\gamma_1,\gamma_2) = 2\pi^2$ then there exists a conformal map $F:\mathbb R^3 \rightarrow {S^3}$ such that $F\circ \gamma_1(t)=(\cos t,\sin t,0,0)$ and $F\circ \gamma_2(t)=(0,0,\cos t,\sin t)$ (the standard Hopf link up to orientation and reparameterization).

Given two non-intersecting differentiable curves $\gamma_1, \gamma_2 \colon S^1 \rightarrow \mathbb{R}^3$, define the Gauss map $\Gamma$ from the torus to the sphere by

$$\Gamma(s,t) = \frac{\gamma_1(s) - \gamma_2(t)}{|\gamma_1(s) - \gamma_2(t)|}.$$

The Gauss map of a link $(\gamma_1,\gamma_2)$ in $\mathbf R^4$, denoted by $g=G(\gamma_1,\gamma_2)$, is the Lipschitz map $g:S^1 \times S^1 \to S^3$ defined by $g(s,t) = \frac{\gamma_1(s)-\gamma_2(t)}{|\gamma_1(s)-\gamma_2(t)|}.$ We denote an open ball in $\mathbf R^4$, centered at $\mathbf x$ with radius $r$, by $B^4_r(\mathbf x)$. The boundary of this ball is denoted by $S^3_r(\mathbf x)$. An intrinsic open ball of $S^3$, centered at $\mathbf p\in S^3$ with radius $r$, is denoted by $B_r(\mathbf p)$. We have

$$\frac{\partial g}{\partial s}= {\dot \gamma_1-\langle g,\dot\gamma_1\rangle g \over |\gamma_1-\gamma_2|}\quad\mbox{and}\quad
\frac{\partial g}{\partial t}= -{\dot\gamma_2-\langle g,\dot\gamma_2\rangle g\over|\gamma_1-\gamma_2|}.$$

Thus,

$$\begin{align}\left| \frac{\partial g}{\partial s}\right|^2 \left| \frac{\partial g}{\partial t}\right|^2-\left\langle \frac{\partial g}{\partial s}, \frac{\partial g}{\partial t}\right\rangle^2
&\leq \left| \frac{\partial g}{\partial s}\right|^2 \left| \frac{\partial g}{\partial t}\right|^2 \\
&=\frac{|\dot \gamma_1|^2-\langle g,\dot \gamma_1\rangle^2}{|\gamma_1-\gamma_2|^2}\frac{|\dot\gamma_2|^2-\langle g,\dot\gamma_2\rangle^2}{|\gamma_1-\gamma_2|^2} \\
&\leq \frac{|\dot \gamma_1|^2|\dot\gamma_2|^2}{|\gamma_1-\gamma_2|^4}.
\end{align}$$

It follows that for almost every $(s,t)\in S^1\times S^1$, $|{\rm Jac\, }g|(s,t)\leq \frac{|\dot \gamma_1(s)||\dot\gamma_2(t)|}{|\gamma_1(s)-\gamma_2(t)|^2}.$ If equality holds at $(s,t)$, then $\langle \dot \gamma_1(s),\dot\gamma_2(t) \rangle = \langle \dot \gamma_1(s),\gamma_1(s)-\gamma_2(t) \rangle=\langle \dot\gamma_2(t),\gamma_1(s)-\gamma_2(t) \rangle=0.$

${\mathbf M}(C) \leq \int_{S^1\times S^1} |{\rm Jac\, }g|\,ds\,dt\leq E(\gamma_1,\gamma_2).$

If the link $(\gamma_1,\gamma_2)$ is contained in an oriented affine hyperplane with unit normal vector $\mathbf p\in S^3$ compatible with the orientation, then $C={\rm link}(\gamma_1,\gamma_2) \cdot \partial B_{\pi/2}(-\mathbf p).$
