= Dold–Thom theorem =

On the homotopy groups of the infinite symmetric product of a connected CW complex

In algebraic topology, the Dold-Thom theorem states that the homotopy groups of the infinite symmetric product of a connected CW complex are the same as its reduced homology groups. The most common version of its proof consists of showing that the composition of the homotopy group functors with the infinite symmetric product defines a reduced homology theory. One of the main tools used in doing so are quasifibrations. The theorem has been generalised in various ways, for example by the Almgren isomorphism theorem.

There are several other theorems constituting relations between homotopy and homology, for example the Hurewicz theorem. Another approach is given by stable homotopy theory. Thanks to the Freudenthal suspension theorem, one can see that the latter actually defines a homology theory. Nevertheless, none of these allow one to directly reduce homology to homotopy. This advantage of the Dold-Thom theorem makes it particularly interesting for algebraic geometry.

== Statement ==
Dold-Thom theorem. For a connected CW complex X one has π_{n}SP(X) ≅ H̃_{n}(X), where H̃_{n} denotes reduced homology and SP stands for the infinite symmetric product.

It is also very useful that there exists an isomorphism φ : π_{n}SP(X) → H̃_{n}(X) which is compatible with the Hurewicz homomorphism h: π_{n}(X) → H̃_{n}(X), meaning that one has a commutative diagram

where i_{*} is the map induced by the inclusion i: X = SP^{1}(X) → SP(X).

The following example illustrates that the requirement of X being a CW complex cannot be dropped offhand: Let X = CH ∨ CH be the wedge sum of two copies of the cone over the Hawaiian earring. The common point of the two copies is supposed to be the point 0 ∈ H meeting every circle. On the one hand, H_{1}(X) is an infinite group while H_{1}(CH) is trivial. On the other hand, π_{1}(SP(X)) ≅ π_{1}(SP(CH)) × π_{1}(SP(CH)) holds since φ : SP(X) × SP(Y) → SP(X ∨ Y) defined by φ([x_{1}, ..., x_{n}], [y_{1}, ..., y_{n}]) = ([x_{1}, ..., x_{n}, y_{1}, ..., y_{n}]) is a homeomorphism for compact X and Y.

But this implies that either π_{1}(SP(CH)) ≅ H_{1}(CH) or π_{1}(SP(X)) ≅ H_{1}(X) does not hold.

== Sketch of the proof ==
One wants to show that the family of functors h_{n} = π_{n} $\circ$ SP defines a homology theory. Dold and Thom chose in their initial proof a slight modification of the Eilenberg-Steenrod axioms, namely calling a family of functors (h̃_{n})_{n∈N_{0}} from the category of basepointed, connected CW complexes to the category of abelian groups a reduced homology theory if they satisfy

1. If f ≃ g: X → Y, then f_{*} = g_{*}: h̃_{n}(X) → h̃_{n}(Y), where ≃ denotes pointed homotopy equivalence.
2. There are natural boundary homomorphisms ∂ : h̃_{n}(X/A) → h̃_{n−1}(A) for each pair (X, A) with X and A being connected, yielding an exact sequence
  $\qquad \dots\xrightarrow{\partial} \tilde{h}_n(A)\xrightarrow{i_*}\tilde{h}_n(X) \xrightarrow{q_*} \tilde{h}_n(X/A)\xrightarrow{\partial} \tilde{h}_{n-1}(A)\xrightarrow{i_*} \dots$
  where i: A → X is the inclusion and q: X → X/A is the quotient map.
3. h̃_{n}(S^{1}) = 0 for n ≠ 1, where S^{1} denotes the circle.
4. Let (X_{λ}) be the system of compact subspaces of a pointed space X containing the basepoint. Then (X_{λ}) is a direct system together with the inclusions. Denote by $i_\lambda\colon X_\lambda\to X$ respectively $i_\lambda^\mu\colon X_\lambda\to X_\mu$ the inclusion if X_{λ} ⊂ X_{μ}. h̃_{n}(X_{λ}) is a direct system as well with the morphisms ${i_\lambda^\mu}_*$. Then the homomorphism
  $\qquad i_*\colon \varinjlim \tilde{h}_n(X_\lambda)\to \tilde{h}_n(X),$
  induced by the $i_{\lambda*}$ is required to be an isomorphism.

One can show that for a reduced homology theory (h̃_{n})_{n∈N_{0}} there is a natural isomorphism h̃_{n}(X) ≅ H̃_{n}(X; G) with G = h̃_{1}(S^{1}).

Clearly, h_{n} is a functor fulfilling property 1 as SP is a homotopy functor. Moreover, the third property is clear since one has SP(S^{1}) ≃ S^{1}. So it only remains to verify the axioms 2 and 4. The crux of this undertaking will be the first point. This is where quasifibrations come into play:

The goal is to prove that the map p_{*}: SP(X) → SP(X/A) induced by the quotient map p: X → X/A is a quasifibration for a CW pair (X, A) consisting of connected complexes. First of all, as every CW complex is homotopy equivalent to a simplicial complex, X and A can be assumed to be simplicial complexes. Furthermore, X will be replaced by the mapping cylinder of the inclusion A → X. This will not change anything as SP is a homotopy functor. It suffices to prove by induction that p_{*} : E_{n} → B_{n} is a quasifibration with B_{n} = SP^{n}(X/A) and E_{n} = p_{*}^{−1}(B_{n}). For n = 0 this is trivially fulfilled. In the induction step, one decomposes B_{n} into an open neighbourhood of B_{n−1} and B_{n} − B_{n−1} and shows that these two sets are, together with their intersection, distinguished, i.e. that p restricted to each of the preimages of these three sets is a quasifibration. It can be shown that B_{n} is then already distinguished itself. Therefore, p_{*} is indeed a quasifibration on the whole SP(X) and the long exact sequence of such a one implies that axiom 2 is satisfied as p_{*}^{−1}([e]) ≅ SP(A) holds.

One may wonder whether p_{*} is not even a fibration. However, that turns out not to be the case: Take an arbitrary path x_{t} for t ∈ [0, 1) in X − A approaching some a ∈ A and interpret it as a path in X/A ⊂ SP(X/A). Then any lift of this path to SP(X) is of the form x_{t}α_{t} with α_{t} ∈ A for every t. But this means that its endpoint aα_{1} is a multiple of a, hence different from the basepoint, so the Homotopy lifting property fails to be fulfilled.

Verifying the fourth axiom can be done quite elementary, in contrast to the previous one.

One should bear in mind that there is a variety of different proofs although this one is seemingly the most popular. For example, proofs have been established via factorisation homology or simplicial sets. One can also proof the theorem using other notions of a homology theory (the Eilenberg-Steenrod axioms e.g.).

=== Compatibility with the Hurewicz homomorphism ===
In order to verify the compatibility with the Hurewicz homomorphism, it suffices to show that the statement holds for X = S^{n}. This is because one then gets a prism

for each Element [f] ∈ π_{n}(X) represented by a map f: S^{n} → X. All sides except possibly the one at the bottom commute in this diagram. Therefore, one sees that the whole diagram commutes when considering where 1 ∈ π_{n}(S^{n}) ≅ Z gets mapped to. However, by using the suspension isomorphisms for homotopy respectively homology groups, the task reduces to showing the assertion for S^{1}. But in this case the inclusion SP^{1}(S^{1}) → SP(S^{1}) is a homotopy equivalence.

== Applications ==
=== Mayer-Vietoris sequence ===
One direct consequence of the Dold-Thom theorem is a new way to derive the Mayer-Vietoris sequence. One gets the result by first forming the homotopy pushout square of the inclusions of the intersection A ∩ B of two subspaces A, B ⊂ X into A and B themselves. Then one applies SP to that square and finally π_{*} to the resulting pullback square.

=== A theorem of Moore ===
Another application is a new proof of a theorem first stated by Moore. It basically predicates the following:

Theorem. A path-connected, commutative and associative H-space X with a strict identity element has the weak homotopy type of a generalised Eilenberg-MacLane space.

Note that SP(Y) has this property for every connected CW complex Y and that it therefore has the weak homotopy type of a generalised Eilenberg-MacLane space. The theorem amounts to saying that all k-invariants of a path-connected, commutative and associative H-space with strict unit vanish.

==== Proof ====
Let G_{n} = π_{n}(X). Then there exist maps M(G_{n}, n) → X inducing an isomorphism on π_{n} if n ≥ 2 and an isomorphism on H_{1} if n = 1 for a Moore space M(G_{n}, n). These give a map

$$\bigvee_n M(G_n,n)\to X$$

if one takes the maps to be basepoint-preserving. Then the special H-space structure of X yields a map

$$f\colon \operatorname{SP}\left( \bigvee_n M(G_n,n) \right)\to X$$

given by summing up the images of the coordinates. But as there are natural homeomorphisms

$$\operatorname{SP} \left( \bigvee_\alpha X_\alpha \right)\cong \prod_\alpha \operatorname{SP}(X_\alpha),$$

with Π denoting the weak product, f induces isomorphisms on π_{n} for n ≥ 2. But as π_{1}(X) → π_{1}SP(X) = H_{1}(X) induced by the inclusion X → SP(X) is the Hurewicz homomorphism and as H-spaces have abelian fundamental groups, f also induces isomorphisms on π_{1}. Thanks to the Dold-Thom theorem, each SP(M(G_{n}, n)) is now an Eilenberg-MacLane space K(G_{n}, n). This also implies that the natural inclusion of the weak product Π_{n} SP(M(G_{n}, n)) into the cartesian product is a weak homotopy equivalence. Therefore, X has the weak homotopy type of a generalised Eilenberg-MacLane space.

=== Algebraic geometry ===
What distinguishes the Dold-Thom theorem from other alternative foundations of homology like Čech or Alexander-Spanier cohomology is that it is of particular interest for algebraic geometry since it allows one to reformulate homology only using homotopy. Since applying methods from algebraic topology can be quite insightful in this field, one tries to transfer these to algebraic geometry. This could be achieved for homotopy theory, but for homology theory only in a rather limited way using a formulation via sheaves. So the Dold-Thom theorem yields a foundation of homology having an algebraic analogue.
