= Jun O'Hara =

Japanese mathematician

Jun O'Hara, legally named Jun Imai (今井 淳, Imai Jun), is a Japanese mathematician who works on the fields of low-dimensional topology and knot theory. He is a professor at Chiba University.

He is known for his discovery of Möbius energy, a type of knot energy.

He was born on 29 March 1963 in Hiroshima, Japan.

He was a PhD student of Takashi Tsuboi at the University of Tokyo.

== Selected publications ==
- Energy of knots and conformal geometry. World Scientific, Singapore, ISBN 9812383166 (2003).
- "Energy of a knot", Topology v. 30 n. 2, pp. 241–247 (1991)

== See also ==
- Knot energy
