= Knot energy =

In physical knot theory, a knot energy is a functional on the space of all knot conformations. A conformation of a knot is a particular embedding of a circle into three-dimensional space. Depending on the needs of the energy function, the space of conformations is restricted to a sufficiently nicely behaved class. For example, one may consider only polygonal circles or C^{2} functions. A property of the functional often requires that evolution of the knot under gradient descent does not change knot type.

== Definition ==
Let $X$ be a subspace of $C(\mathbb S^1, \mathbb R^3)$ or of $C(\mathbb{S}^1, \mathbb{S}^3)$ with a topology (for example $C^1$ or some Sobolev-space with appropriate regularity) and let $\mathcal{K}_X:=\{ \gamma \in X: \gamma \text{ is a topological embedding} \}$. A functional $F:\mathcal{K}_X \rightarrow \overline{\mathbb{R}}$ is called self-repulsive with respect topology on $X$ if $F(\gamma_n) \rightarrow +\infty$ for all sequences $(\gamma_n)_{n\in \mathbb{N}} \subset \mathcal{K}_X$ converging to an immersion with double point with respect to the topology on $X$.

A functional $F:\mathcal{K}_X \rightarrow \overline{\mathbb{R}}$ is a knot energy if and only if $F$ is a self-repulsive functional and bounded from below.

== Electrical charge ==
The most common type of knot energy comes from the intuition of the knot as electrically charged. Coulomb's law states that two electric charges of the same sign will repel each other as the inverse square of the distance. Thus the knot will evolve under gradient descent according to the electric potential to an ideal configuration that minimizes the electrostatic energy. Naively defined, the integral for the energy will diverge and a regularization trick from physics, subtracting off a term from the energy, is necessary. In addition the knot could change knot type under evolution unless self-intersections are prevented.

== Variations ==
An electrostatic energy of polygonal knots was studied by Fukuhara in 1987 and shortly after a different, geometric energy was studied by Sakuma. In 1988, Jun O'Hara defined a knot energy based on electrostatic energy, Möbius energy. A fundamental property of the O'Hara energy function is that infinite energy barriers exist for passing the knot through itself. With some additional restrictions, O'Hara showed there were only finitely many knot types with energies less than a given bound. Later, Freedman, He, and Wang removed these restrictions.

Another type of knot energy arises from a more geometric idea. For example, the tangent point energies, first defined by Gonzalez and Maddocks. There, one double-integrate the inverse of the radius of the smallest circle being tangent at one point and passing through another point over the whole curve.

A similar kind of knot energies is given by the integral Menger curvature. There, one investigates the inverse of the radius the circle passing through three points of the knot and integrates this (three times) over the whole knot.
