= Frederick J. Almgren Jr. =

American mathematician (1933–1997)

Frederick Justin Almgren
- Born: July 3, 1933; Birmingham, Alabama, U.S.
- Died: February 5, 1997 (aged 63); Princeton, New Jersey, U.S.
- Education: Brown University
- Known for: Plateau's problem, theory of varifolds, Almgren–Pitts min-max theory
- Spouse: Jean Taylor
- Awards: Guggenheim Fellowship (1974)
- Scientific career
- Fields: Geometric measure theory
- Workplaces: Princeton University
- Thesis: The Homotopy Groups of the Integral Cycle Groups (1962)
- Doctoral advisor: Herbert Federer
- Notable students: Robert V. Kohn; Frank Morgan; Harold R. Parks; Jon T. Pitts; John M. Sullivan; Jean Taylor; Brian White

Frederick Justin Almgren Jr. (July 3, 1933 – February 5, 1997) was an American mathematician working in geometric measure theory. He was born in Birmingham, Alabama.

Almgren received a Guggenheim Fellowship in 1974. Between 1963 and 1992 he was a frequent visiting scholar at the Institute for Advanced Study in Princeton.

Almgren wrote one of the longest papers in mathematics, proving what is now called the Almgren regularity theorem: the singular set of an m-dimensional mass-minimizing surface has dimension at most m−2. He also developed the concept of varifold, first defined by L. C. Young in (Young 1951), and proposed them as generalized solutions to Plateau's problem in order to deal with the problem even when a concept of orientation is missing. He played also an important role in the founding of The Geometry Center.

Almgren was a student of Herbert Federer, one of the founders of geometric measure theory, and was the advisor and husband (as his second wife) of Jean Taylor. His daughter, Ann S. Almgren, is an applied mathematician who works on computational simulations in astrophysics. His son, Robert F. Almgren, is an applied mathematician working on market microstructure and trade execution.

Almgren died in Princeton, New Jersey on February 5, 1997, aged 63.

== Selected publications ==
- Almgren, Frederick J. Jr. (1964), The theory of varifolds: A variational calculus in the large for the $k$-dimensional area integrand, Princeton: Institute for Advanced Study. A set of mimeographed notes in which Frederick J. Almgren Jr. introduces the term "varifold" for the first time.
- Almgren, Frederick J. Jr. (1966), Plateau's Problem: An Invitation to Varifold Geometry, Mathematics Monographs Series (1st ed.), New York–Amsterdam: W. A. Benjamin, Inc., pp. XII+74, MR 0190856, Zbl 0165.13201. The first widely circulated book describing the concept of a varifold and its applications to the Plateau's problem.
- Almgren, Frederick J. Jr. (1999), Taylor, Jean E. (ed.), Selected works of Frederick J. Almgren, Jr., Collected Works, vol. 13, Providence, R.I.: American Mathematical Society, ISBN 978-0-8218-1067-5, MR 1747253, Zbl 0966.01031.
- Almgren, Frederick J. Jr. (2000), Taylor, Jean E.; Scheffer, Vladimir (eds.), Almgren's big regularity paper. Q-valued functions minimizing Dirichlet's integral and the regularity of area-minimizing rectifiable currents up to codimension 2, World Scientific Monograph Series in Mathematics, vol. 1, River Edge, NJ: World Scientific Publishing Co. Inc., ISBN 978-981-02-4108-7, MR 1777737, Zbl 0985.49001.
- Almgren, Frederick J. Jr. (2001) [1966], Plateau's Problem: An Invitation to Varifold Geometry, Student Mathematical Library, vol. 13 (2nd ed.), Providence, RI: American Mathematical Society, pp. xvi, 78, ISBN 978-0-8218-2747-5, MR 1853442, Zbl 0995.49001. The second edition of the book (Almgren 1966).

== See also ==
- Almgren regularity theorem
- Almgren–Pitts min-max theory
- Almgren Isomorphism Theorem
