= Yau's conjecture =

Mathematical conjecture

- Field: Differential geometry
- Conjectured by: Shing-Tung Yau
- Conjectured in: 1982
- First proof by: Antoine Song
- First proof in: 2018

In differential geometry, Yau's conjecture is a mathematical conjecture which states that any closed Riemannian 3-manifold contains infinitely many smooth closed immersed minimal surfaces. It is named after Shing-Tung Yau, who posed it as the 88th entry in his 1982 list of open problems in differential geometry.

The conjecture was first resolved by Fernando Codá Marques and André Neves in the case of positive Ricci curvature. Then, for the case of generic metrics, there are independent solutions from Kei Irie, Fernando Codá Marques and André Neves, Otis Chodosh and Christos Mantoulidis, and also Xin Zhou. Finally, Antoine Song proved the conjectures for all metrics. The proofs above use min-max theory, which is a form of infinite dimensional Morse theory for the area functional. A proof for the generic metric case via gluing construction was also later found by Adrian Chun-Pong Chu and Daniel Stern, in which the minimal surfaces constructed have bounded area but unbounded genus.
