= Ann S. Almgren =

American mathematician

- Title: Fellow at the Society for Industrial and Applied Mathematics
- Parent: Frederick J. Almgren, Jr.

Academic background
- Education: Harvard University (BS) University of California, Berkeley (MS, PhD)
- Thesis: A Fast Adaptive Vortex Method Using Local Corrections (1991)
- Doctoral advisor: Phillip Colella

Academic work
- Discipline: Applied Mathematics
- Sub-discipline: Computational Algorithms; Numerical Analysis
- Institutions: Lawrence Livermore National Laboratory Lawrence Berkeley National Laboratory

Ann S. Almgren is an American applied mathematician who works as a senior scientist and department head of the Applied Mathematics Department in the Computing Sciences Area of the Lawrence Berkeley National Laboratory. She was formerly the group lead of the Center for Computational Sciences and Engineering. Her primary research interests are in computational algorithms for solving PDE's for fluid dynamics in a variety of application areas. Her current projects include the development and implementation of new multiphysics algorithms in high-resolution adaptive mesh codes that are designed for the latest multicore architectures.

== Education and career ==
Almgren is the daughter of mathematician Frederick J. Almgren, Jr. and his first wife, Beverly Stewart. She earned a bachelor's degree in physics from Harvard University in 1984 and a master's degree in mechanical engineering from University of California, Berkeley in 1987. Her doctoral degree in mechanical engineering was completed in 1991 at UC Berkeley under the direction of Phillip Colella with a dissertation titled A Fast Adaptive Vortex Method in Three Dimensions. After visiting the Institute for Advanced Study, she joined the applied mathematics group of the Lawrence Livermore National Laboratory in 1992, and moved to the Lawrence Berkeley National Laboratory in 1996.

== Recognition ==
In 2015 she became a fellow of the Society for Industrial and Applied Mathematics "for contributions to the development of numerical methods for fluid dynamics and applying them to large-scale scientific and engineering problems."
