= Willmore conjecture =

Theorem in differential geometry

- Field: Differential geometry
- Conjectured by: Thomas Willmore
- Conjectured in: 1965
- First proof by: Fernando Codá Marques and André Neves
- First proof in: 2012

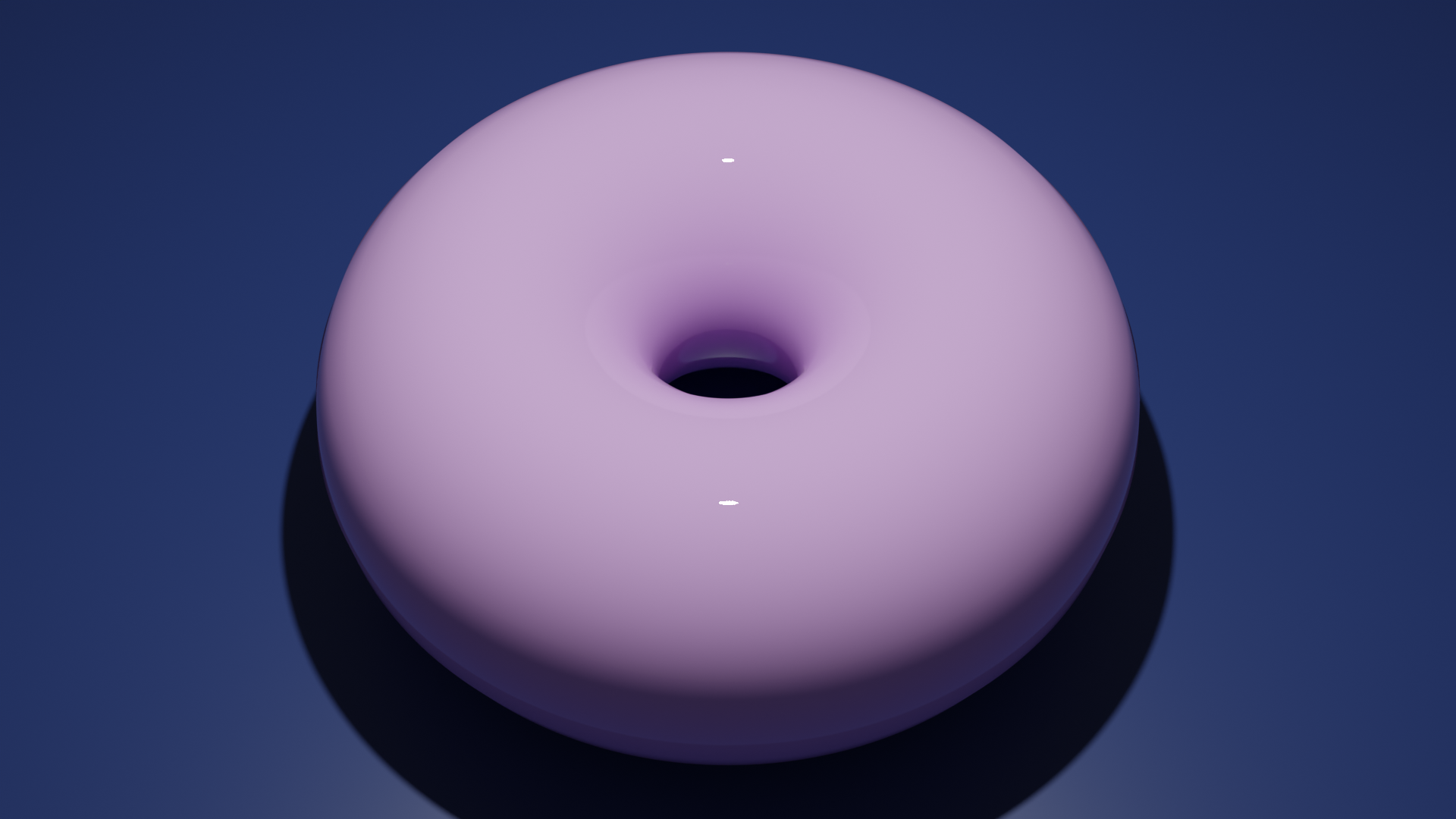
The torus with minimal Willmore energy, with major radius √2 and minor radius 1

In differential geometry, the Willmore conjecture is a lower bound on the Willmore energy of a torus. It is named after the English mathematician Tom Willmore, who conjectured it in 1965. A proof by Fernando Codá Marques and André Neves was announced in 2012 and published in 2014.

== Background ==
Let v : M → R^{3} be a smooth immersion of a compact, orientable surface. Giving M the Riemannian metric induced by v, let H : M → R be the mean curvature (the arithmetic mean of the principal curvatures κ_{1} and κ_{2} at each point) and let K be the Gaussian curvature. In this notation, the Willmore energy W(M) of M is given by

$$W(M) = \int_M H^2 \, dA - \int_M K \, dA.$$

It is not hard to prove that the Willmore energy satisfies W(M) ≥ 0, with equality if and only if M is an embedded round sphere.

== Statement ==
Calculation of W(M) for a few examples suggests that there should be a better bound than W(M) ≥ 4π for surfaces with genus g(M) > 0. In particular, calculation of W(M) for tori with various symmetries led Willmore to propose in 1965 the following conjecture, which now bears his name

For every smooth immersed torus M in R^{3}, W(M) ≥ 2π^{2}.

In 1982, Peter Wai-Kwong Li and Shing-Tung Yau proved the conjecture in the non-embedded case, showing that if $f:\Sigma\to S^3$ is an immersion of a compact surface, which is not an embedding, then W(M) is at least 8π.

In 2012, Fernando Codá Marques and André Neves proved the conjecture in the embedded case, using the Almgren–Pitts min-max theory of minimal surfaces. Prior to the proof of Marques and Neves, the Willmore conjecture had already been proved for many special cases, such as tube tori (by Willmore himself), and for tori of revolution (by Langer & Singer).
