= Plateau's laws =

Set of mathematical rules governing the structure of soap films

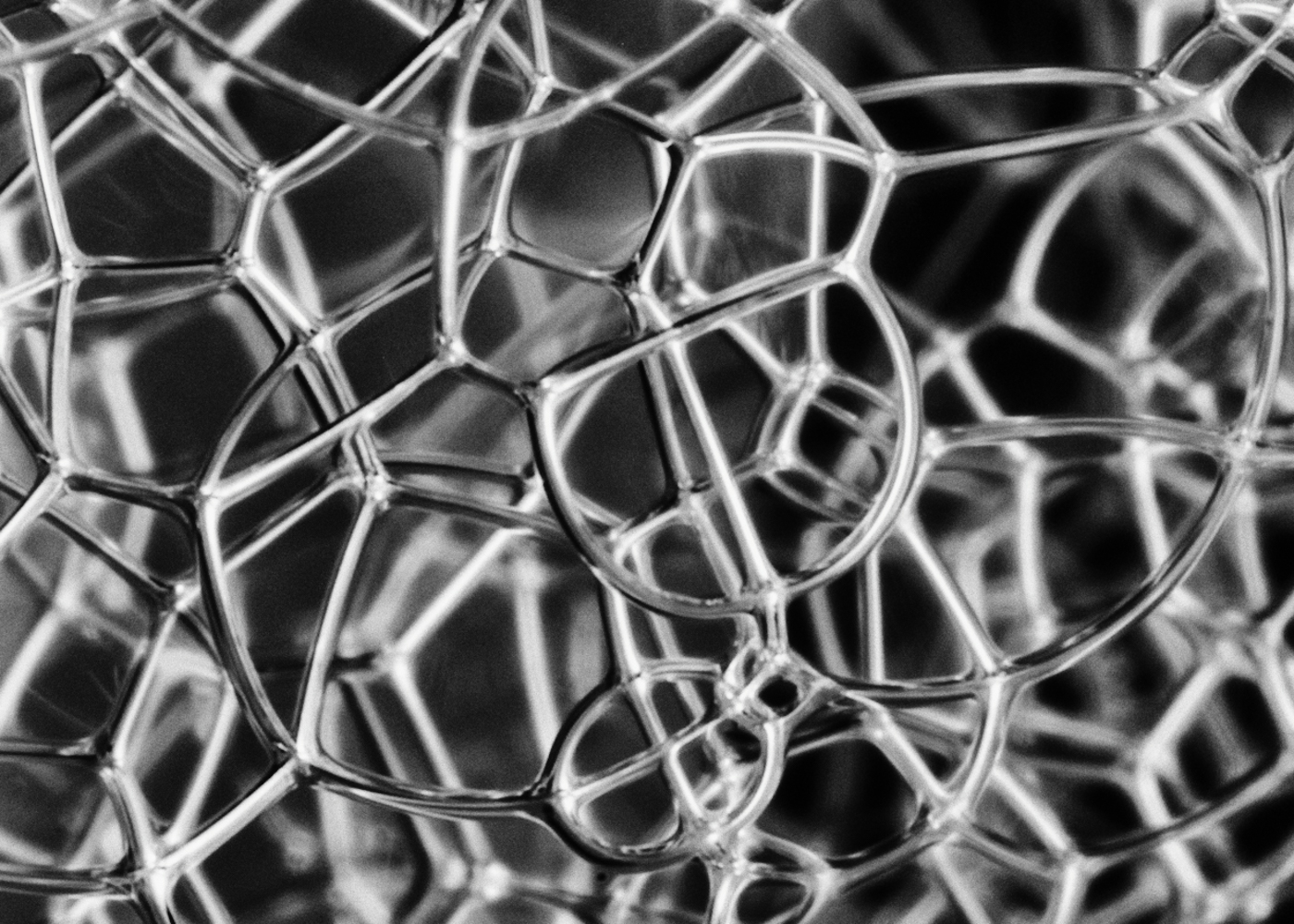
Bubbles in a foam of soap. Soap films meet in threes at about 120° along Plateau borders and these borders meet at vertices at about the tetrahedral angle.

Plateau's laws describe the structure of soap films. These laws were formulated in the 19th century by the Belgian physicist Joseph Plateau from his experimental observations. Many patterns in nature are based on foams obeying these laws.

== Description ==
Plateau's laws describe the shape and configuration of soap films as follows:

1. Soap films are made of entire (unbroken) smooth surfaces.
2. The mean curvature of a portion of a soap film is everywhere constant on any point on the same piece of soap film.
3. Soap films always meet in threes along an edge called a Plateau border, and they do so at an angle of arccos(−1/2) = 120°.
4. These Plateau borders meet in fours at a vertex, at the tetrahedral angle of arccos(−1/3) ≈ 109.47°.

Configurations other than those of Plateau's laws are unstable, and the film will quickly tend to rearrange itself to conform to these laws.

That these laws hold for minimal surfaces was proved mathematically by Jean Taylor using geometric measure theory.

== See also ==
- Young–Laplace equation, governing the curvature of surfaces in a soap film

== Sources ==
- Ball, Philip (2009). Shapes. Nature's Patterns: a tapestry in three parts. Oxford University Press. pp. 66–71, 97–98, 291–292. ISBN 978-0-19-960486-9.
