= Harold R. Parks =

American mathematician (born 1949)

Harold Raymond Parks
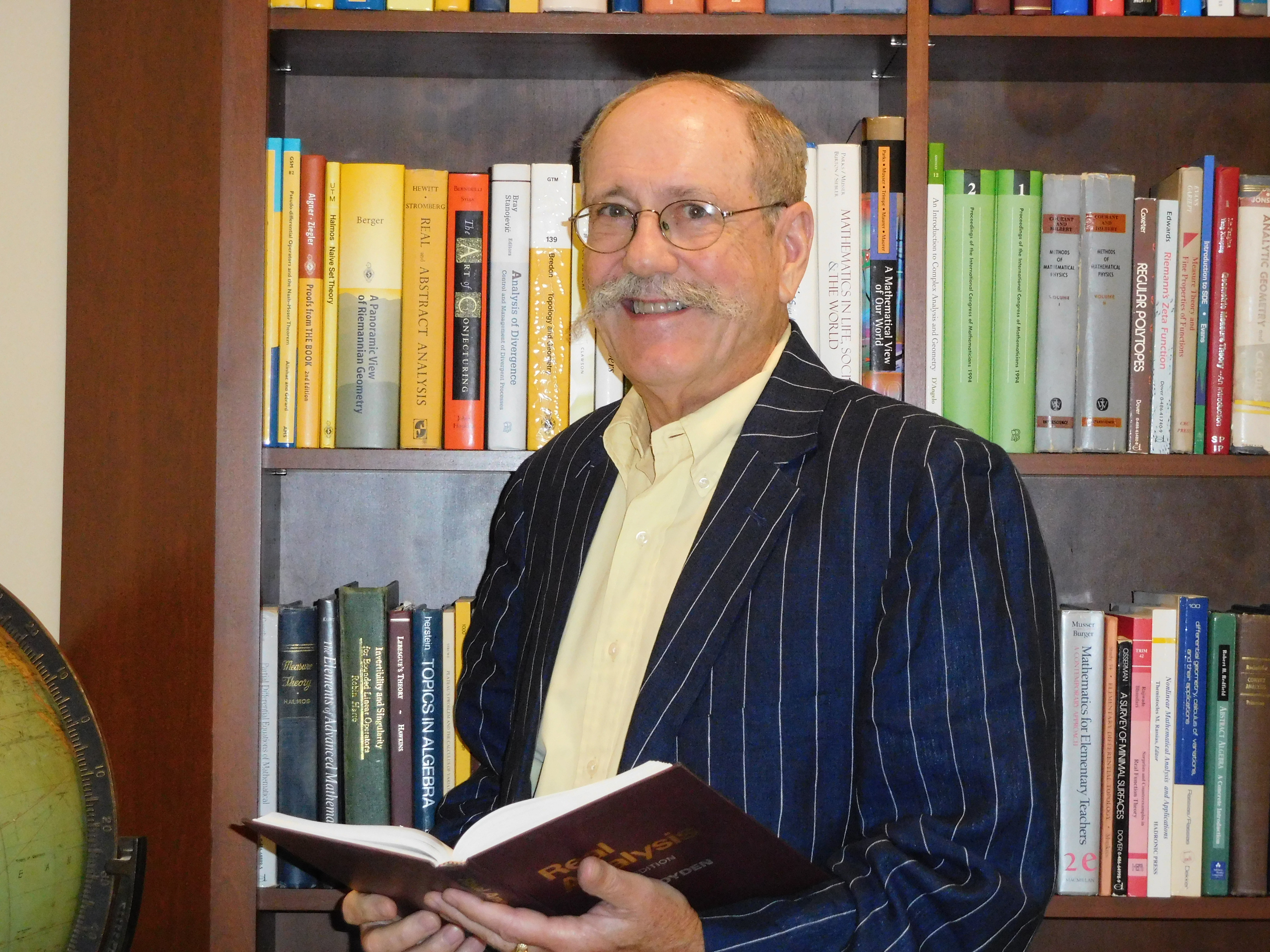
- Education: Dartmouth College, Princeton University
- Known for: Geometric measure theory
- Scientific career
- Workplaces: Oregon State University
- Doctoral advisor: Frederick J. Almgren, Jr.

Harold Raymond Parks (born May 22, 1949) is an American mathematician and is a professor emeritus of mathematics at Oregon State University.

Parks obtained his Ph.D. in 1974 from Princeton University, under the supervision of Frederick J. Almgren, Jr. In 2012, he became a fellow of the American Mathematical Society.

He has developed and implemented a computational technique for computing parametric area minimizing surfaces. He derived an existence and regularity theory for a class of constrained variational problems. Parks has discovered, and characterized, a type of minimal surface with surprising properties, defined in terms of the Jacobi elliptic functions.
