= Joseph Plateau =

Belgian physicist (1801–1883)

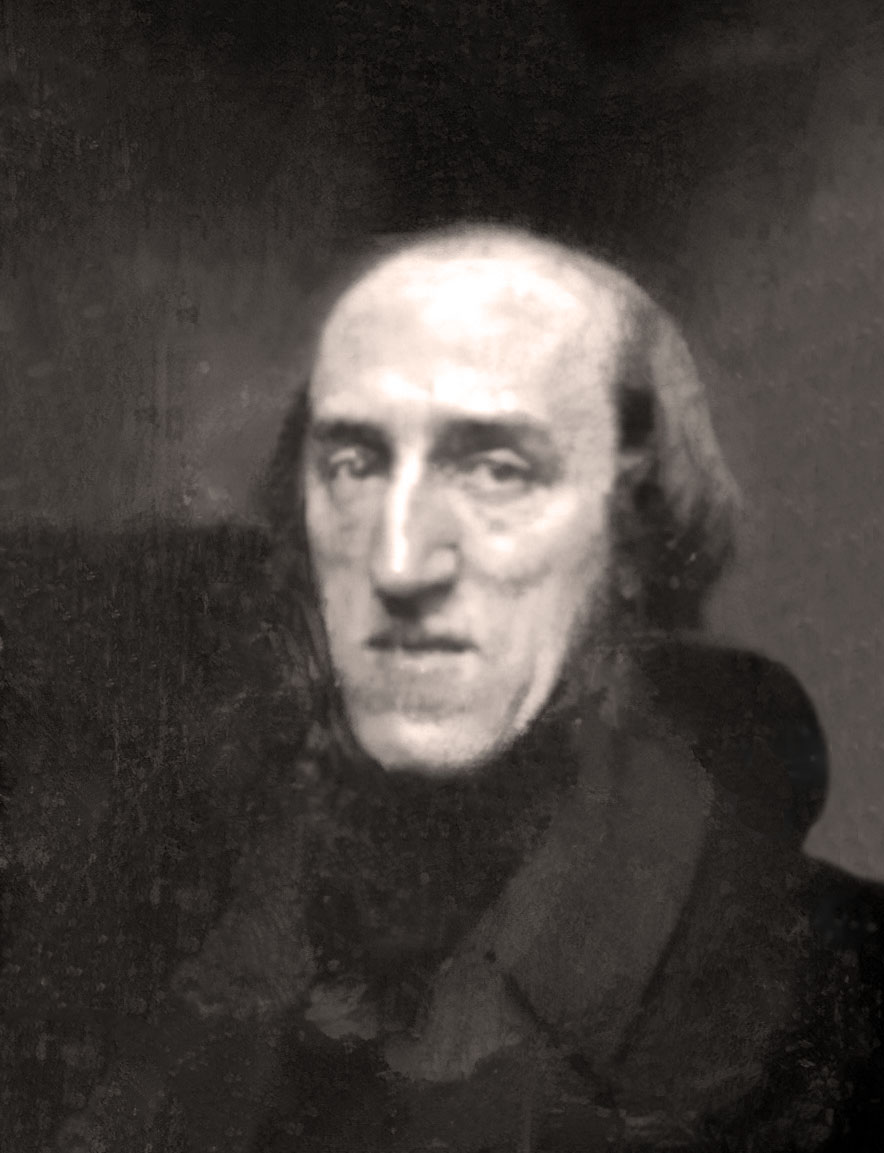
- Plateau in 1843
- Born: 14 October 1801; Brussels, French Republic
- Died: 15 September 1883 (aged 81); Ghent, Belgium
- Education: University of Liège
- Known for: Plateau's laws Plateau's problem Plateau–Rayleigh instability
- Scientific career
- Workplaces: Ghent University
- Doctoral advisor: Adolphe Quetelet

Joseph Antoine Ferdinand Plateau (French: [ʒozɛf ɑ̃twan fɛʁdinɑ̃ plato]; 14 October 1801 – 15 September 1883) was a Belgian physicist and mathematician. He was one of the first people to demonstrate the illusion of a moving image. To do this, he used counterrotating disks with repeating drawn images in small increments of motion on one and regularly spaced slits in the other. He called this device of 1832 the phenakistiscope.

== Biography ==
Plateau was born on 14 October 1801, in Brussels. His father, Antoine Plateau (fr) born in Tournai, was a talented flower painter. At the age of six, the younger Plateau already could read, making him a child prodigy in those times. While attending primary school, he was particularly impressed by a lesson of physics; enchanted by the experiments he observed, he vowed to discover their secrets someday. Plateau spent his school holidays in Marche-les-Dames, with his uncle and his family; his cousin and playfellow was Auguste Payen, who later became an architect and the principal designer of the Belgian railways. At the age of fourteen, he lost his father and mother; the trauma caused by this loss made him fall ill.

On 27 August 1840, Plateau married Augustine–Thérèse–Aimée–Fanny Clavareau, and they had a son a year later. His daughter Alice Plateau married Gustave Van der Mensbrugghe in 1871, who became his collaborator and later his first biographer.

Fascinated by the persistence of luminous impressions on the retina, Plateau performed an experiment in which he gazed directly into the Sun for 25 seconds. He lost his eyesight later in his life and attributed the loss to this experiment. However, this may not have been the case, and he may have instead had chronic uveitis.

Plateau became a foreign member of the Royal Netherlands Academy of Arts and Sciences in 1872.

Plateau died in Ghent in 1883.

== Academic career ==
Plateau studied at the State University of Liège, where he graduated as a doctor of physical and mathematical sciences in 1829.

In 1827, Plateau became a teacher of mathematics at the "Atheneum" school in Brussels. In 1835, he was appointed Professor of Physics and Applied Physics at the State University in Ghent.

== Research ==
=== Optics ===
Plateau's phenakistiscope

Plateau's animated snakes (phenakistiscope)

In 1829, Plateau submitted his doctoral thesis to his mentor Adolphe Quetelet for advice. It contained only 27 pages but formulated a great number of fundamental conclusions. It contained the first results of his research into the effect of colours on the retina (duration, intensity, and colour), his mathematical research into the intersections of revolving curves (locus), the observation of the distortion of moving images, and the reconstruction of distorted images through counter revolving discs (he dubbed these anorthoscopic discs). In 1832, Plateau invented an early stroboscopic device, the "phenakistiscope", the first device to give the illusion of a moving image. It consisted of two disks, one with small equidistant radial windows, through which the viewer could look, and another containing a sequence of images. When the two disks rotated at the correct speed, the synchronization of the windows and the images created an animated effect. The projection of stroboscopic photographs, creating the illusion of motion, eventually led to the development of cinema.

=== Plateau's problem ===
Plateau also studied the phenomena of capillary action and surface tension. The mathematical problem of existence of a minimal surface with a given boundary is named after him. He conducted extensive studies of soap films and formulated Plateau's laws, which describe the structures formed by such films in foams.

== Works ==
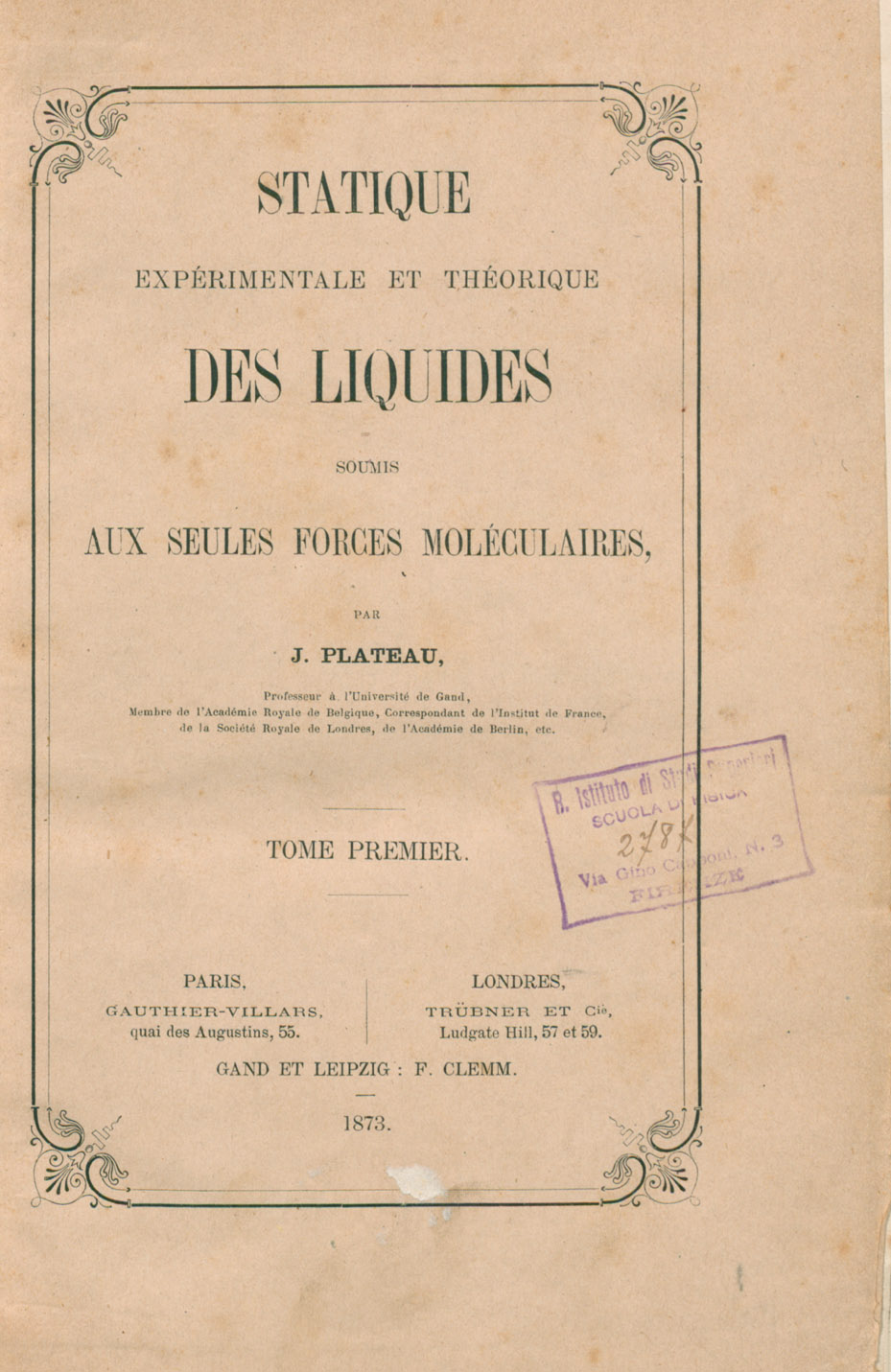
Statique expérimentale et théorique des liquides soumis aux seules forces moléculaires, 1873

- Statique expérimentale et théorique des liquides soumis aux seules forces moléculaires (in French). Vol. 1. Paris: Gauthier-Villars. 1873.
  - Statique expérimentale et théorique des liquides soumis aux seules forces moléculaires (in French). Vol. 2. Paris: Gauthier-Villars. 1873.

== In popular culture ==
On 14 October 2019, the search engine Google commemorated Plateau with a Doodle on his 218th birth anniversary. This doodle was created by animator, filmmaker, and Doodler Olivia Huynh with inspiration and help from Diana Tran and Tom Tabanao. It is the first Google Doodle with different artwork showing up across different device displays—desktop, mobile, and the Google App.

== See also ==
- Patterns in nature
- Plateau's laws
- Plateau's problem
- Plateau–Rayleigh instability
- Soap bubble
- Stretched grid method
