= Yamabe flow =

In differential geometry, the Yamabe flow is an intrinsic geometric flow—a process which deforms the metric of a Riemannian manifold. First introduced by Richard S. Hamilton, Yamabe flow is for noncompact manifolds, and is the negative L^{2}-gradient flow of the (normalized) total scalar curvature, restricted to a given conformal class: it can be interpreted as deforming a Riemannian metric to a conformal metric of constant scalar curvature, when this flow converges.

The Yamabe flow was introduced in response to Richard S. Hamilton's own work on the Ricci flow and Rick Schoen's solution of the Yamabe problem on manifolds of positive conformal Yamabe invariant.

== Main results ==
The fixed points of the Yamabe flow are metrics of constant scalar curvature in the given conformal class. The flow was first studied in the 1980s in unpublished notes of Richard Hamilton. Hamilton conjectured that, for every initial metric, the flow converges to a conformal metric of constant scalar curvature. This was verified by Rugang Ye in the locally conformally flat case. Later, Simon Brendle proved convergence of the flow for all conformal classes and arbitrary initial metrics. The limiting constant-scalar-curvature metric is typically no longer a Yamabe minimizer in this context. While the compact case is settled, the flow on complete, non-compact manifolds is not completely understood, and remains a topic of current research.
