= Jon T. Pitts =

American mathematician

Jon T. Pitts (1948–2024) was an American mathematician who worked on geometric analysis and variational calculus. He was a professor at Texas A&M University.

Pitts was born on 10 January 1948. Pitts obtained his Ph.D. from Princeton University in 1974 under the supervision of Frederick Almgren, Jr., with the thesis Every Compact Three-Dimensional Manifold Contains Two-Dimensional Minimal Submanifolds.

He received a Sloan Fellowship in 1981.

The Almgren–Pitts min-max theory is named after his teacher and him.

Pitts died on 30 May 2024.

== Selected publications ==
- Existence and regularity of minimal surfaces on Riemannian manifolds. Vol. 27. Mathematical Notes. Princeton, NJ; University of Tokyo Press, Tokyo: Princeton University Press, 1981, pp. iv+330. ISBN 0-691-08290-1.
- "Applications of minimax to minimal surfaces and the topology of 3-manifolds"
- "Existence of minimal surfaces of bounded topological type in three-manifolds"
