= Yamabe problem =

Differential geometry conjecture

The Yamabe problem refers to a conjecture in the mathematical field of differential geometry, which was resolved in the 1980s. It is a statement about the scalar curvature of Riemannian manifolds:

Let (M,g) be a closed smooth Riemannian manifold. Then there exists a positive and smooth function f on M such that the Riemannian metric fg has constant scalar curvature.

By computing a formula for how the scalar curvature of fg relates to that of g, this statement can be rephrased in the following form:

Let (M,g) be a closed smooth Riemannian manifold. Then there exists a positive and smooth function φ on M, and a number c, such that

$$\frac{4(n-1)}{n-2}\Delta^g\varphi+R^g\varphi+c\varphi^{(n+2)/(n-2)}=0.$$

Here n denotes the dimension of M, R^{g} denotes the scalar curvature of g, and ∆^{g} denotes the Laplace-Beltrami operator of g.

The mathematician Hidehiko Yamabe, in the paper Yamabe (1960), gave the above statements as theorems and provided a proof; however, Trudinger (1968) discovered an error in his proof. The problem of understanding whether the above statements are true or false became known as the Yamabe problem. The combined work of Yamabe, Trudinger, Thierry Aubin, and Richard Schoen provided an affirmative resolution to the problem in 1984.

It is now regarded as a classic problem in geometric analysis, with the proof requiring new methods in the fields of differential geometry and partial differential equations. A decisive point in Schoen's ultimate resolution of the problem was an application of the positive energy theorem of general relativity, which is a purely differential-geometric mathematical theorem first proved (in a provisional setting) in 1979 by Schoen and Shing-Tung Yau.

There has been more recent work due to Simon Brendle, Marcus Khuri, Fernando Codá Marques, and Schoen, dealing with the collection of all positive and smooth functions f such that, for a given Riemannian manifold (M,g), the metric fg has constant scalar curvature. Additionally, the Yamabe problem as posed in similar settings, such as for complete noncompact Riemannian manifolds, is not yet fully understood.

== The Yamabe problem in special cases ==
Here, we refer to a "solution of the Yamabe problem" on a Riemannian manifold $(M,\overline{g})$ as a Riemannian metric g on M for which there is a positive smooth function $\varphi:M\to\mathbb{R},$ with $g=\varphi^{-2}\overline{g}.$

=== On a closed Einstein manifold ===
Let $(M,\overline{g})$ be a smooth Riemannian manifold. Consider a positive smooth function $\varphi:M\to\mathbb{R},$ so that $g=\varphi^{-2}\overline{g}$ is an arbitrary element of the smooth conformal class of $\overline{g}.$ A standard computation shows

$$\overline{R}_{ij}-\frac{1}{n}\overline{R}\overline{g}_{ij}=R_{ij}-\frac{1}{n}Rg_{ij}+\frac{n-2}{\varphi}\Big(\nabla_i\nabla_j\varphi+\frac{1}{n}g_{ij}\Delta\varphi\Big).$$

Taking the g-inner product with $\textstyle\varphi(\operatorname{Ric}-\frac{1}{n}Rg)$ results in

$$\varphi\left\langle\overline{\operatorname{Ric}}-\frac{1}{n}\overline{R}\overline{g},\operatorname{Ric}-\frac{1}{n}Rg\right\rangle_g=\varphi\Big|\operatorname{Ric}-\frac{1}{n}Rg\Big|_g^2+(n-2)\Big(\big\langle\operatorname{Ric},\operatorname{Hess}\varphi\big\rangle_g-\frac{1}{n}R\Delta\varphi\Big).$$

If $\overline{g}$ is assumed to be Einstein, then the left-hand side vanishes. If $M$ is assumed to be closed, then one can do an integration by parts, recalling the Bianchi identity $\textstyle\operatorname{div}\operatorname{Ric}=\frac{1}{2}\nabla R,$ to see

$$\int_M \varphi\Big|\operatorname{Ric}-\frac{1}{n}Rg\Big|^2\,d\mu_g=(n-2)\Big(\frac{1}{2}-\frac{1}{n}\Big)\int_M \langle\nabla R,\nabla\varphi\rangle\,d\mu_g.$$

If g has constant scalar curvature, then the right-hand side vanishes. The consequent vanishing of the left-hand side proves the following fact, due to Obata (1971):

Every solution to the Yamabe problem on a closed Einstein manifold is Einstein.

Obata then went on to prove that, except in the case of the standard sphere with its usual constant-sectional-curvature metric, the only constant-scalar-curvature metrics in the conformal class of an Einstein metric (on a closed manifold) are constant multiples of the given metric. The proof proceeds by showing that the gradient of the conformal factor is actually a conformal Killing field. If the conformal factor is not constant, following flow lines of this gradient field, starting at a minimum of the conformal factor, then allows one to show that the manifold is conformally related to the cylinder $S^{n-1}\times \mathbb{R}$, and hence has vanishing Weyl curvature.

== The non-compact case ==
A closely related question is the so-called "non-compact Yamabe problem", which asks: Is it true that on every smooth complete Riemannian manifold (M,g) which is not compact, there exists a metric that is conformal to g, has constant scalar curvature and is also complete? The answer is no, due to counterexamples given by Jin (1988). Various additional criteria under which a solution to the Yamabe problem for a non-compact manifold can be shown to exist are known (for example Aviles & McOwen (1988)); however, obtaining a full understanding of when the problem can be solved in the non-compact case remains a topic of research.

== See also ==
- Yamabe flow
- Yamabe invariant
