= John Guckenheimer =

American mathematician

John Mark Guckenheimer
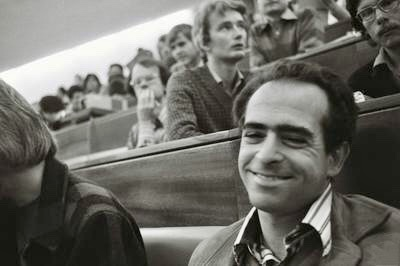
- Born: 1945 (age 80–81); Baton Rouge, Louisiana
- Education: Harvard University (AB); University of California, Berkeley (PhD)
- Known for: Dynamical systems Bifurcation theory
- Awards: Leroy P. Steele Prize (2013)
- Scientific career
- Fields: Mathematician
- Workplaces: University of California, Santa Cruz; Cornell University
- Doctoral advisor: Stephen Smale

John Mark Guckenheimer (born 1945) joined the Department of Mathematics at Cornell University in 1985. He was previously at the University of California, Santa Cruz (1973-1985). He was a Guggenheim fellow in 1984, and was elected president of the Society for Industrial and Applied Mathematics (SIAM), serving from 1997 to 1998. Guckenheimer received his A.B. in 1966 from Harvard and his Ph.D. in 1970 from Berkeley, where his Ph.D. thesis advisor was Stephen Smale.

His book Nonlinear Oscillations, Dynamical Systems and Bifurcation of Vector Fields (with Philip Holmes) is an extensively cited work on dynamical systems.

== Research ==
Guckenheimer's research has focused on three areas — neuroscience, algorithms for periodic orbits, and dynamics in systems with multiple time scales.

=== Neuroscience ===
Guckenheimer studies dynamical models of a small neural system, the stomatogastric ganglion of crustaceans — attempting to learn more about neuromodulation, the ways in which the rhythmic output of the STG is modified by chemical and electrical inputs.

=== Algorithms for periodic orbits ===
Employing automatic differentiation, Guckenheimer has constructed a new family of algorithms that compute periodic orbits directly. His research in this area attempts to automatically compute bifurcations of periodic orbits as well as "generate rigorous computer proofs of the qualitative properties of numerically computed dynamical systems".

=== Dynamics in systems with multiple time scales ===
Guckenheimer's research in this area is aimed at "extending the qualitative theory of dynamical systems to apply to systems with multiple time scales". Examples of systems with multiple time scales include neural systems and switching controllers.

=== DsTool ===
Guckenheimer's research has also included the development of computer methods used in studies of nonlinear systems. He has overseen the development of DsTool, an interactive software laboratory for the investigation of dynamical systems.

== Awards and honors ==
He became a SIAM Fellow in 2009. In 2012 he became a fellow of the American Mathematical Society. He won a Leroy P. Steele Prize in 2013 for his book (coauthored with Philip Holmes), and he gave the Moser Lecture in May 2015.

== Selected publications ==
- Nonlinear Oscillations, Dynamical Systems and Bifurcation of Vector Fields (with Philip Holmes), Springer-Verlag, 1983, 453 pp.
- Phase portraits of planar vector fields: computer proofs, Journal of Experimental Mathematics 4 (1995), 153–164.
- An improved parameter estimation method for Hodgkin-Huxley model (with A. R. Willms, D. J. Baro and R. M. Harris-Warrick), J. Comp. Neuroscience 6 (1999), 145–168.
- Computing periodic orbits and their bifurcations with automatic differentiation (with B. Meloon), SIAM J. Sci. Stat. Comp. 22 (2000), 951–985.
- The forced van der Pol equation I: the slow flow and its bifurcations (with K. Hoffman and W. Weckesser), SIAM J. App. Dyn. Sys. 2 (2002), 1–35.
