= Thomas Willmore =

English geometer (1919–2005)

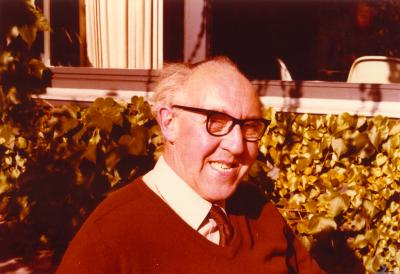
- Willmore in 1979 at the Mathematical Research Institute of Oberwolfach, photo by Prof. Konrad Jacobs.
- Born: 16 April 1919; Gillingham, Dorset, England
- Died: 20 February 2005 (aged 85)
- Education: King's College London
- Known for: Willmore energy, Willmore flow, Willmore conjecture
- Scientific career
- Fields: Mathematician
- Workplaces: King's College London, University of Durham, University of Liverpool

Notes
- Note: PhD written/gained during WWII, advisor unknown

Thomas James Willmore (16 April 1919 – 20 February 2005) was an English geometer. He is best known for his work on Riemannian 3-space and harmonic spaces.

== Career ==
Willmore studied at King's College London. After his graduation in 1939, he was appointed as a lecturer, but the onset of World War II led him to working as a scientific officer at RAF Cardington, working mainly on barrage balloon defences. During the war, he found the time to write his Ph.D. on relativistic cosmology, and gained his Ph.D. on Clock regraduations and general relativity as an external student of the University of London in 1943.

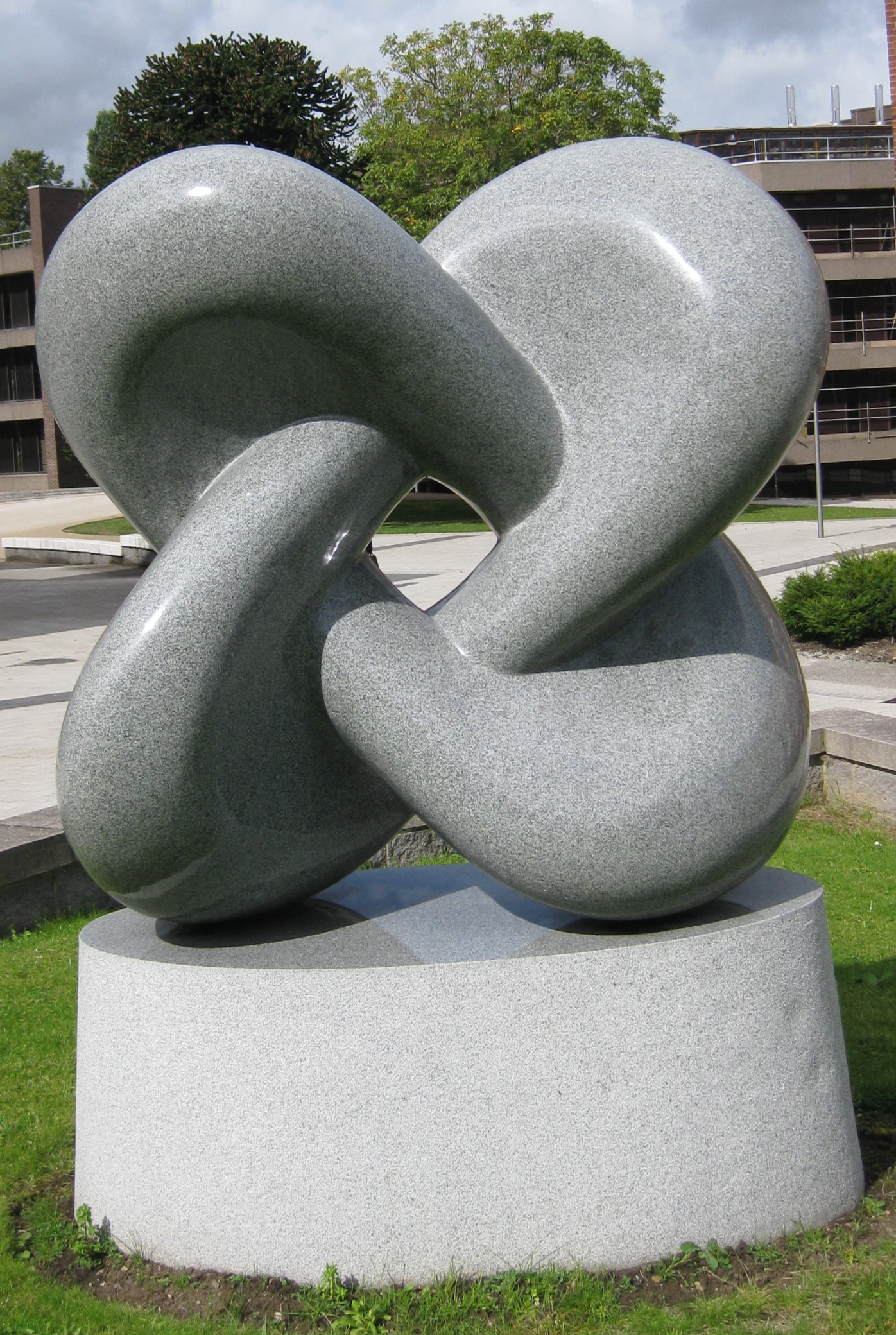
"Willmore Surface" sculpture at Durham University in memory of Willmore

In 1946, he was given a lectureship at the University of Durham. He wrote an influential book with Arthur Geoffrey Walker and HS Ruse entitled Harmonic Spaces in 1953. He left Durham in 1954 for the University of Liverpool to join Walker, after a supposed dispute between Willmore and a Durham colleague who refused to order German textbooks after being wounded in World War I.

In 1965, Willmore returned to Durham, where he was appointed Professor of Pure Mathematics. He was elected vice president of the London Mathematical Society in 1977, a post he held for two years. During that time, he was elected a member of The Royal Academies for Science and the Arts of Belgium.

Willmore retired from the University of Durham in 1984 after holding the position of Head of the Department of Mathematical Sciences on three occasions, covering most of his Professorship there. He was given an honorary degree from the Open University in 1994.

A sculpture by Peter Sales was unveiled at the university on 13 March 2012. It is entitled "Willmore Surface" and depicts a 4-lobed Willmore torus.

== Books ==
- Willmore, T. J. (April 2013) [June 1959]. An Introduction to Differential Geometry. Oxford University Press. ISBN 9780486282107.
- Ruse, H. S.; Walker, A. G.; Willmore, T. J. (1961). Harmonic Spaces. Edizioni Cremonese.
- Willmore, T. J.; Hitchin, N (February 1984). Global Riemannian Geometry. Ellis Horwood. ISBN 0-13-357583-7.
- Willmore, T. J. (August 1997). Riemannian Geometry. Oxford University Press. ISBN 0-19-851492-1.

== See also ==
- Willmore conjecture
- Willmore energy
- Willmore flow
