= Chessboard complex =

Mathematical object in topological graph theory

A chessboard complex is a particular kind of abstract simplicial complex, which has various applications in topological graph theory and algebraic topology. Informally, the (m, n)-chessboard complex contains all sets of positions on an m-by-n chessboard, where rooks can be placed without attacking each other. Equivalently, it is the matching complex of the (m, n)-complete bipartite graph, or the independence complex of the m-by-n rook's graph.

== Definitions ==
For any two positive integers m and n, the (m, n)-chessboard complex $\Delta_{m,n}$ is the abstract simplicial complex with vertex set $[m]\times [n]$ that contains all subsets S such that, if $(i_1,j_1)$ and $(i_2,j_2)$ are two distinct elements of S, then both $i_1\neq i_2$ and $j_1\neq j_2$. The vertex set can be viewed as a two-dimensional grid (a "chessboard"), and the complex contains all subsets S that do not contain two cells in the same row or in the same column. In other words, all subset S such that rooks can be placed on them without taking each other.

The chessboard complex can also be defined succinctly using deleted join. Let D_{m} be a set of m discrete points. Then the chessboard complex is the n-fold 2-wise deleted join of D_{m}, denoted by $(D_m)^{*n}_{\Delta(2)}$.

Another definition is the set of all matchings in the complete bipartite graph $K_{m,n}$.

== Examples ==
In any (m,n)-chessboard complex, the neighborhood of each vertex has the structure of a (m − 1,n − 1)-chessboard complex. In terms of chess rooks, placing one rook on the board eliminates the remaining squares in the same row and column, leaving a smaller set of rows and columns where additional rooks can be placed. This allows the topological structure of a chessboard to be studied hierarchically, based on its lower-dimensional structures. An example of this occurs with the (4,5)-chessboard complex, and the (3,4)- and (2,3)-chessboard complexes within it:

- The (2,3)-chessboard complex is a hexagon, consisting of six vertices (the six squares of the chessboard) connected by six edges (pairs of non-attacking squares).
- The (3,4)-chessboard complex is a triangulation of a torus, with 24 triangles (triples of non-attacking squares), 36 edges, and 12 vertices. Six triangles meet at each vertex, in the same hexagonal pattern as the (2,3)-chessboard complex.
- The (4,5)-chessboard complex forms a three-dimensional pseudomanifold: in the neighborhood of each vertex, 24 tetrahedra meet, in the pattern of a torus, instead of the spherical pattern that would be required of a manifold. If the vertices are removed from this space, the result can be given a geometric structure as a cusped hyperbolic 3-manifold, topologically equivalent to the link complement of a 20-component link.

== Properties ==
Every facet of $\Delta_{m,n}$ contains $\min(m,n)$ elements. Therefore, the dimension of $\Delta_{m,n}$ is $\min(m,n)-1$.

The homotopical connectivity of the chessboard complex is at least $\min\left(m, n, \frac{m+n+1}{3}\right)-2$ (so $\eta \geq \min\left(m, n, \frac{m+n+1}{3}\right)$).

The Betti numbers $b_{r - 1}$ of chessboard complexes are zero if and only if $(m - r)(n - r) > r$. The eigenvalues of the combinatorial Laplacians of the chessboard complex are integers.

The chessboard complex is $(\nu_{m, n} - 1)$-connected, where $\nu_{m, n} := \min\{m, n, \lfloor\frac{m + n + 1}{3}\rfloor \}$. The homology group $H_{\nu_{m, n}}(M_{m, n})$ is a 3-group of exponent at most 9, and is known to be exactly the cyclic group on 3 elements when $m + n \equiv 1\pmod{3}$.

The $(\lfloor\frac{n + m + 1}{3}\rfloor - 1)$-skeleton of chessboard complex is vertex decomposable in the sense of Provan and Billera (and thus shellable), and the entire complex is vertex decomposable if $n\geq 2m - 1$. As a corollary, any position of k rooks on a m-by-n chessboard, where $k\leq\lfloor\frac{m + n + 1}{3}\rfloor$, can be transformed into any other position using at most $mn - k$ single-rook moves (where each intermediate position is also not rook-taking).

== Generalizations ==
The complex $\Delta_{n_1,\ldots,n_k}$ is a "chessboard complex" defined for a k-dimensional chessboard. Equivalently, it is the set of matchings in a complete k-partite hypergraph. This complex is at least $(\nu - 2)$-connected, for $\nu := \min\{n_1, \lfloor\frac{n_1 + n_2 + 1}{3}\rfloor, \dots, \lfloor\frac{n_1 + n_2 + \dots + n_k + 1}{2k + 1}\rfloor\}$
