= Homotopical connectivity =

Topological property

In algebraic topology, homotopical connectivity is a property describing a topological space based on the dimension of its holes. In general, low homotopical connectivity indicates that the space has at least one low-dimensional hole. The concept of n-connectedness generalizes the concepts of path-connectedness and simple connectedness.

An equivalent definition of homotopical connectivity is based on the homotopy groups of the space. A space is n-connected (or n-simple connected) if its first n homotopy groups are trivial.

Homotopical connectivity is defined for maps, too. A map is n-connected if it is an isomorphism "up to dimension n, in homotopy".

== Definition using holes ==
All definitions below consider a topological space X.

A hole in X is, informally, a thing that prevents some suitably placed sphere from continuously shrinking to a point. Equivalently, it is a sphere that cannot be continuously extended to a ball. Formally,

- A d-dimensional sphere in X is a continuous function $f_d: S^d \to X$.
- A d-dimensional ball in X is a continuous function $g_d: B^d \to X$.
- A d-dimensional-boundary hole in X is a d-dimensional sphere that is not nullhomotopic (- cannot be shrunk continuously to a point). Equivalently, it is a d-dimensional sphere that cannot be continuously extended to a (d+1)-dimensional ball. It is sometimes called a (d+1)-dimensional hole (d+1 is the dimension of the "missing ball").
- X is called n-connected if it contains no holes of boundary-dimension d ≤ n.
- The homotopical connectivity of X, denoted $\text{conn}_{\pi}(X)$, is the largest integer n for which X is n-connected.
- A slightly different definition of connectivity, which makes some computations simpler, is: the smallest integer d such that X contains a d-dimensional hole. This connectivity parameter is denoted by $\eta_{\pi}(X)$, and it differs from the previous parameter by 2, that is, $\eta_{\pi}(X) := \text{conn}_{\pi}(X) + 2$.

=== Examples ===
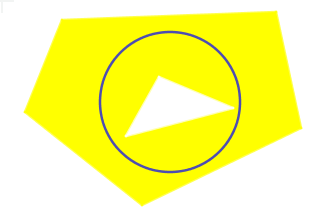
A 2-dimensional hole (a hole with a 1-dimensional boundary).

- A 2-dimensional hole (a hole with a 1-dimensional boundary) is a circle (S^{1}) in X, that cannot be shrunk continuously to a point in X. An example is shown on the figure at the right. The yellow region is the topological space X; it is a pentagon with a triangle removed. The blue circle is a 1-dimensional sphere in X. It cannot be shrunk continuously to a point in X; therefore; X has a 2-dimensional hole. Another example is the punctured plane - the Euclidean plane with a single point removed, $\mathbb{R}^2\setminus \{(0,0)\}$. To make a 2-dimensional hole in a 3-dimensional ball, make a tunnel through it. In general, a space contains a 1-dimensional-boundary hole if and only if it is not simply-connected. Hence, simply-connected is equivalent to 1-connected. X is 0-connected but not 1-connected, so $\text{conn}_{\pi}(X) = 0$. The lowest dimension of a hole is 2, so $\eta_{\pi}(X) = 2$.
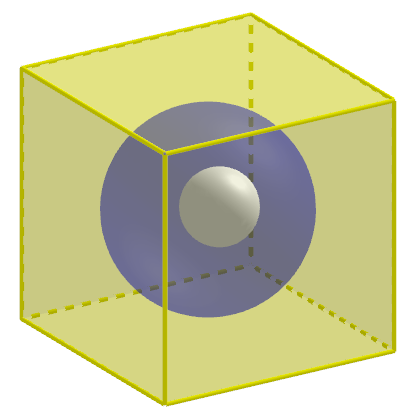
  A 3-dimensional hole.
- A 3-dimensional hole (a hole with a 2-dimensional boundary) is shown on the figure at the right. Here, X is a cube (yellow) with a ball removed (white). The 2-dimensional sphere (blue) cannot be continuously shrunk to a single point. X is simply-connected but not 2-connected, so $\text{conn}_{\pi}(X) = 1$. The smallest dimension of a hole is 3, so $\eta_{\pi}(X) = 3$.

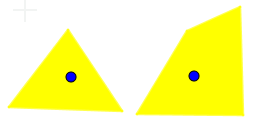
A 1-dimensional hole.

- For a 1-dimensional hole (a hole with a 0-dimensional boundary) we need to consider $S^0$ - the zero-dimensional sphere. What is a zero dimensional sphere? - For every integer d, the sphere $S^d$ is the boundary of the (d+1)-dimensional ball $B^{d+1}$. So $S^0$ is the boundary of $B^1$, which is the segment [0,1]. Therefore, $S^0$ is the set of two disjoint points {0, 1}. A zero-dimensional sphere in X is just a set of two points in X. If there is such a set, that cannot be continuously shrunk to a single point in X (or continuously extended to a segment in X), this means that there is no path between the two points, that is, X is not path-connected; see the figure at the right. Hence, path-connected is equivalent to 0-connected. X is not 0-connected, so $\text{conn}_{\pi}(X) = -1$. The lowest dimension of a hole is 1, so $\eta_{\pi}(X) = 1$.
- A 0-dimensional hole is a missing 0-dimensional ball. A 0-dimensional ball is a single point; its boundary $S^{-1}$ is an empty set. Therefore, the existence of a 0-dimensional hole is equivalent to the space being empty. Hence, non-empty is equivalent to (−1)-connected. For an empty space X, $\text{conn}_{\pi}(X) = -2$ and $\eta_{\pi}(X) = 0$, which is its smallest possible value.
- A ball has no holes of any dimension. Therefore, its connectivity is infinite: $\eta_{\pi}(X) = \text{conn}_{\pi}(X) = \infty$.

=== Homotopical connectivity of spheres ===
In general, for every integer d, $\text{conn}_{\pi}(S^d)=d-1$ (and $\eta_{\pi}(S^d)=d+1$) The proof requires two directions:

- Proving that $\text{conn}_{\pi}(S^d) < d$, that is, $S^d$ cannot be continuously shrunk to a single point. This can be proved using the Borsuk–Ulam theorem.
- Proving that $\text{conn}_{\pi}(S^d) \geq d-1$, that is, that is, every continuous map $S^k \to S^d$ for $k < d$ can be continuously shrunk to a single point.

== Definition using groups ==
A space X is called n-connected, for n ≥ 0, if it is non-empty, and all its homotopy groups of order d ≤ n are the trivial group:
$$\pi_d(X) \cong 0, \quad -1 \leq d \leq n,$$
where $\pi_i(X)$ denotes the i-th homotopy group and 0 denotes the trivial group. The two definitions are equivalent. The requirement for an n-connected space consists of requirements for all d ≤ n:

- The requirement for d=−1 means that X should be nonempty.
- The requirement for d=0 means that X should be path-connected.
- The requirement for any d ≥ 1 means that X contains no holes of boundary dimension d. That is, every d-dimensional sphere in X is homotopic to a constant map. Therefore, the d-th homotopy group of X is trivial. The opposite is also true: If X has a hole with a d-dimensional boundary, then there is a d-dimensional sphere that is not homotopic to a constant map, so the d-th homotopy group of X is not trivial. In short, X has a hole with a d-dimensional boundary, if-and-only-if $\pi_d(X) \not \cong 0$.The homotopical connectivity of X is the largest integer n for which X is n-connected.

The requirements of being non-empty and path-connected can be interpreted as (−1)-connected and 0-connected, respectively, which is useful in defining 0-connected and 1-connected maps, as below. The 0th homotopy set can be defined as:
$$\pi_0(X, *) := \left[\left(S^0, *\right), \left(X, *\right)\right].$$

This is only a pointed set, not a group, unless X is itself a topological group; the distinguished point is the class of the trivial map, sending S^{0} to the base point of X. Using this set, a space is 0-connected if and only if the 0th homotopy set is the one-point set. The definition of homotopy groups and this homotopy set require that X be pointed (have a chosen base point), which cannot be done if X is empty.

A topological space X is path-connected if and only if its 0th homotopy group vanishes identically, as path-connectedness implies that any two points x_{1} and x_{2} in X can be connected with a continuous path which starts in x_{1} and ends in x_{2}, which is equivalent to the assertion that every mapping from S^{0} (a discrete set of two points) to X can be deformed continuously to a constant map. With this definition, we can define X to be n-connected if and only if
$$\pi_i(X) \simeq 0, \quad 0 \leq i \leq n.$$

=== Examples ===
- A space X is (−1)-connected if and only if it is non-empty.
- A space X is 0-connected if and only if it is non-empty and path-connected.
- A space is 1-connected if and only if it is simply connected.
- An n-sphere is (n − 1)-connected.

== n-connected map ==
The corresponding relative notion to the absolute notion of an n-connected space is an n-connected map, which is defined as a map whose homotopy fiber Ff is an (n − 1)-connected space. In terms of homotopy groups, it means that a map $f\colon X \to Y$ is n-connected if and only if:

- $\pi_i(f)\colon \pi_i(X) \mathrel{\overset{\sim}{\to}} \pi_i(Y)$ is an isomorphism for $i < n$, and
- $\pi_n(f)\colon \pi_n(X) \twoheadrightarrow \pi_n(Y)$ is a surjection.

The last condition is frequently confusing; it is because the vanishing of the (n − 1)-st homotopy group of the homotopy fiber Ff corresponds to a surjection on the n^{th} homotopy groups in the exact sequence
$$\pi_n(X) \mathrel{\overset{\pi_n(f)}{\to}} \pi_n(Y) \to \pi_{n-1}(Ff).$$

If the group on the right $\pi_{n-1}(Ff)$ vanishes, then the map on the left is a surjection.

Low-dimensional examples:

- A connected map (0-connected map) is one that is onto path components (0th homotopy group); this corresponds to the homotopy fiber being non-empty.
- A simply connected map (1-connected map) is one that is an isomorphism on path components (0th homotopy group) and onto the fundamental group (1st homotopy group).

n-connectivity for spaces can in turn be defined in terms of n-connectivity of maps: a space X with basepoint x_{0} is an n-connected space if and only if the inclusion of the basepoint $x_0 \hookrightarrow X$ is an n-connected map. The single point set is contractible, so all its homotopy groups vanish, and thus "isomorphism below n and onto at n" corresponds to the first n homotopy groups of X vanishing.

=== Interpretation ===
This is instructive for a subset: an n-connected inclusion $A \hookrightarrow X$ is one such that, up to dimension n − 1, homotopies in the larger space X can be homotoped into homotopies in the subset A.

For example, for an inclusion map $A \hookrightarrow X$ to be 1-connected, it must be:

- onto $\pi_0(X),$
- one-to-one on $\pi_0(A) \to \pi_0(X),$ and
- onto $\pi_1(X).$

One-to-one on $\pi_0(A) \to \pi_0(X)$ means that if there is a path connecting two points $a, b \in A$ by passing through X, there is a path in A connecting them, while onto $\pi_1(X)$ means that in fact a path in X is homotopic to a path in A.

In other words, a function which is an isomorphism on $\pi_{n-1}(A) \to \pi_{n-1}(X)$ only implies that any elements of $\pi_{n-1}(A)$ that are homotopic in X are abstractly homotopic in A – the homotopy in A may be unrelated to the homotopy in X – while being n-connected (so also onto $\pi_n(X)$) means that (up to dimension n − 1) homotopies in X can be pushed into homotopies in A.

This gives a more concrete explanation for the utility of the definition of n-connectedness: for example, a space where the inclusion of the k-skeleton is n-connected (for n > k) – such as the inclusion of a point in the n-sphere – has the property that any cells in dimensions between k and n do not affect the lower-dimensional homotopy types.

== Lower bounds ==
Many topological proofs require lower bounds on the homotopical connectivity. There are several "recipes" for proving such lower bounds.

=== Homology ===
The Hurewicz theorem relates the homotopical connectivity $\text{conn}_{\pi}(X)$ to the homological connectivity, denoted by $\text{conn}_H(X)$. This is useful for computing homotopical connectivity, since the homological groups can be computed more easily.

Suppose first that X is simply-connected, that is, $\text{conn}_{\pi}(X)\geq 1$. Let $n := \text{conn}_{\pi}(X) + 1\geq 2$; so $\pi_i(X)= 0$ for all $i<n$, and $\pi_n(X)\neq 0$. Hurewicz theorem says that, in this case, $\tilde{H_i}(X)= 0$ for all $i<n$, and $\tilde{H_n}(X)$ is isomorphic to $\pi_n(X)$, so $\tilde{H_n}(X)\neq 0$ too. Therefore:
$$\text{conn}_H(X) = \text{conn}_{\pi}(X).$$
If X is not simply-connected ($\text{conn}_{\pi}(X)\leq 0$), then
$$\text{conn}_H(X)\geq \text{conn}_{\pi}(X)$$
still holds. When $\text{conn}_{\pi}(X)\leq-1$ this is trivial. When $\text{conn}_{\pi}(X)=0$ (so X is path-connected but not simply-connected), one should prove that $\tilde{H_0}(X)= 0$.

The inequality may be strict: there are spaces in which $\text{conn}_{\pi}(X)=0$ but $\text{conn}_H(X)=\infty$.

By definition, the k-th homology group of a simplicial complex depends only on the simplices of dimension at most k+1 (see simplicial homology). Therefore, the above theorem implies that a simplicial complex K is k-connected if and only if its (k+1)-dimensional skeleton (the subset of K containing only simplices of dimension at most k+1) is k-connected.

=== Join ===
Let K and L be non-empty cell complexes. Their join is commonly denoted by $K * L$. Then:
$$\text{conn}_{\pi}(K*L) \geq \text{conn}_{\pi}(K)+\text{conn}_{\pi}(L)+2.$$

The identity is simpler with the eta notation:
$$\eta_{\pi}(K*L) \geq \eta_{\pi}(K)+\eta_{\pi}(L).$$
As an example, let $K = L = S^0 =$ a set of two disconnected points. There is a 1-dimensional hole between the points, so the eta is 1. The join $K * L$ is a square, which is homeomorphic to a circle, so its eta is 2. The join of this square with a third copy of K is a octahedron, which is homeomorphic to $S^2$, and its eta is 3. In general, the join of n copies of $S^0$ is homeomorphic to $S^{n-1}$ and its eta is n.

The general proof is based on a similar formula for the homological connectivity.

=== Nerve ===
Let K_{1},...,K_{n} be abstract simplicial complexes, and denote their union by K.

Denote the nerve complex of {K_{1}, ... , K_{n}} (the abstract complex recording the intersection pattern of the K_{i}) by N.

If, for each nonempty $J\subset I$, the intersection $\bigcap_{i\in J} U_i$ is either empty or (k−|J|+1)-connected, then for every j ≤ k, the j-th homotopy group of N is isomorphic to the j-th homotopy group of K.

In particular, N is k-connected if-and-only-if K is k-connected.

== Homotopy principle ==
In geometric topology, cases when the inclusion of a geometrically defined space, such as the space of immersions $M \to N,$ into a more general topological space, such as the space of all continuous maps between two associated spaces $X(M) \to X(N),$ are n-connected are said to satisfy a homotopy principle or "h-principle". There are a number of powerful general techniques for proving h-principles.

== See also ==
- Connected space
- Connective spectrum
- Path-connected
- Simply connected
