= Geometric realization =

Generally speaking, geometric realization is a one-to-one mapping between abstract mathematical objects and concrete geometric objects. It has slightly different meanings in different contexts. See:

- Geometric realization of an abstract simplicial complex;
- Geometric realization of a simplicial set.
