= Clique complex =

Abstract simplicial complex describing a graph's cliques

The clique complex of a graph. Cliques of size one are shown as small red disks; cliques of size two are shown as black line segments; cliques of size three are shown as light blue triangles; and cliques of size four are shown as dark blue tetrahedra.

Clique complexes, independence complexes, flag complexes, Whitney complexes and conformal hypergraphs are closely related mathematical objects in graph theory and geometric topology that each describe the cliques (complete subgraphs) of an undirected graph.

== Clique complex ==
The clique complex X(G) of an undirected graph G is an abstract simplicial complex (that is, a family of finite sets closed under the operation of taking subsets), formed by the sets of vertices in the cliques of G. Any subset of a clique is itself a clique, so this family of sets meets the requirement of an abstract simplicial complex that every subset of a set in the family should also be in the family.

The clique complex can also be viewed as a topological space in which each clique of k vertices is represented by a simplex of dimension k – 1. The 1-skeleton of X(G) (also known as the underlying graph of the complex) is an undirected graph with a vertex for every 1-element set in the family and an edge for every 2-element set in the family; it is isomorphic to G.

=== Negative example ===
Every clique complex is an abstract simplicial complex, but the opposite is not true. For example, consider the abstract simplicial complex over {1,2,3,4} with maximal sets {1,2,3}, {2,3,4}, {4,1}. If it were the X(G) of some graph G, then G had to have the edges {1,2}, {1,3}, {2,3}, {2,4}, {3,4}, {4,1}, so X(G) should also contain the clique {1,2,3,4}.

== Independence complex ==
The independence complex I(G) of an undirected graph G is an abstract simplicial complex formed by the sets of vertices in the independent sets of G. The clique complex of G is equivalent to the independence complex of the complement graph of G.

== Flag complex ==
A flag complex is an abstract simplicial complex with an additional property called "2-determined": for every subset S of vertices, if every pair of vertices in S is in the complex, then S itself is in the complex too.

Every clique complex is a flag complex: if every pair of vertices in S is a clique of size 2, then there is an edge between them, so S is a clique.

Every flag complex is a clique complex: given a flag complex, define a graph G on the set of all vertices, where two vertices u,v are adjacent in G iff {u,v} is in the complex (this graph is called the 1-skeleton of the complex). By definition of a flag complex, every set of vertices that are pairwise-connected, is in the complex. Therefore, the flag complex is equal to the clique complex on G.

Thus, flag complexes and clique complexes are essentially the same thing. However, in many cases it is convenient to define a flag complex directly from some data other than a graph, rather than indirectly as the clique complex of a graph derived from that data.

Mikhail Gromov defined the no-Δ condition to be the condition of being a flag complex.

== Whitney complex ==
Clique complexes are also known as Whitney complexes, after Hassler Whitney. A Whitney triangulation or clean triangulation of a two-dimensional manifold is an embedding of a graph G onto the manifold in such a way that every face is a triangle and every triangle is a face. If a graph G has a Whitney triangulation, it must form a cell complex that is isomorphic to the Whitney complex of G. In this case, the complex (viewed as a topological space) is homeomorphic to the underlying manifold. A graph G has a 2-manifold clique complex, and can be embedded as a Whitney triangulation, if and only if G is locally cyclic; this means that, for every vertex v in the graph, the induced subgraph formed by the neighbors of v forms a single cycle.

== Conformal hypergraph ==
The primal graph G(H) of a hypergraph is the graph on the same vertex set that has as its edges the pairs of vertices appearing together in the same hyperedge. A hypergraph is said to be conformal if every maximal clique of its primal graph is a hyperedge, or equivalently, if every clique of its primal graph is contained in some hyperedge. If the hypergraph is required to be downward-closed (so it contains all hyperedges that are contained in some hyperedge) then the hypergraph is conformal precisely when it is a flag complex. This relates the language of hypergraphs to the language of simplicial complexes.

== Examples and applications ==
The barycentric subdivision of any cell complex C is a flag complex having one vertex per cell of C. A collection of vertices of the barycentric subdivision form a simplex if and only if the corresponding collection of cells of C form a flag (a chain in the inclusion ordering of the cells). In particular, the barycentric subdivision of a cell complex on a 2-manifold gives rise to a Whitney triangulation of the manifold.

The order complex of a partially ordered set consists of the chains (totally ordered subsets) of the partial order. If every pair of some subset is itself ordered, then the whole subset is a chain, so the order complex satisfies the no-Δ condition. It may be interpreted as the clique complex of the comparability graph of the partial order.

The matching complex of a graph consists of the sets of edges no two of which share an endpoint; again, this family of sets satisfies the no-Δ condition. It may be viewed as the clique complex of the complement graph of the line graph of the given graph. When the matching complex is referred to without any particular graph as context, it means the matching complex of a complete graph. The matching complex of a complete bipartite graph K_{m,n} is known as a chessboard complex. It is the clique graph of the complement graph of a rook's graph, and each of its simplices represents a placement of rooks on an m × n chess board such that no two of the rooks attack each other. When m = n ± 1, the chessboard complex forms a pseudo-manifold.

The Vietoris–Rips complex of a set of points in a metric space is a special case of a clique complex, formed from the unit disk graph of the points; however, every clique complex X(G) may be interpreted as the Vietoris–Rips complex of the shortest path metric on the underlying graph G.

Hodkinson & Otto (2003) describe an application of conformal hypergraphs in the logics of relational structures. In that context, the Gaifman graph of a relational structure is the same as the underlying graph of the hypergraph representing the structure, and a structure is guarded if it corresponds to a conformal hypergraph.

Gromov showed that a cubical complex (that is, a family of hypercubes intersecting face-to-face) forms a CAT(0) space if and only if the complex is simply connected and the link of every vertex forms a flag complex. A cubical complex meeting these conditions is sometimes called a cubing or a space with walls.

== Homology groups ==
Meshulam proves the following theorem on the homology of the clique complex. Given integers $l\geq 1, t\geq 0$, suppose a graph G satisfies a property called $P(l,t)$, which means that:

- Every set of $l$ vertices in G has a common neighbor;
- There exists a set A of vertices, that contains a common neighbor to every set of $l$ vertices, and in addition, the induced graph G[A] does not contain, as an induced subgraph, a copy of the 1-skeleton of the t-dimensional octahedral sphere.

Then the j-th reduced homology of the clique complex X(G) is trivial for any j between 0 and $\max(l-t, \lfloor {l}/{2}\rfloor)-1$.

== See also ==
- Simplex graph, a kind of graph having one node for every clique of the underlying graph
- Partition matroid, a kind of matroid whose matroid intersections may form clique complexes
