= Homological connectivity =

Algebra concept

In algebraic topology, homological connectivity is a property describing a topological space based on its homology groups.

== Definitions ==
=== Background ===
X is homologically-connected if its 0-th homology group equals Z, i.e. $H_0(X)\cong \mathbb{Z}$, or equivalently, its 0-th reduced homology group is trivial: $\tilde{H_0}(X)\cong 0$.

- For example, when X is a graph and its set of connected components is C, $H_0(X)\cong \mathbb{Z}^{|C|}$ and $\tilde{H_0}(X)\cong \mathbb{Z}^{|C|-1}$ (see graph homology). Therefore, homological connectivity is equivalent to the graph having a single connected component, which is equivalent to graph connectivity. It is similar to the notion of a connected space.

X is homologically 1-connected if it is homologically connected, and additionally, its 1-th homology group is trivial, i.e. $H_1(X)\cong 0$.

- For example, when X is a connected graph with vertex-set V and edge-set E, $H_1(X) \cong \mathbb{Z}^{|E|-|V|+1}$. Therefore, homological 1-connectivity is equivalent to the graph being a tree. Informally, it corresponds to X having no "holes" with a 1-dimensional boundary, which is similar to the notion of a simply connected space.

In general, for any integer k, X is homologically k-connected if its reduced homology groups of order 0, 1, ..., k are all trivial. Note that the reduced homology group equals the homology group for 1,..., k (only the 0-th reduced homology group is different).

=== Connectivity ===
The homological connectivity of X, denoted conn_{H}(X), is the largest k ≥ 0 for which X is homologically k-connected. Examples:

- If all reduced homology groups of X are trivial, then conn_{H}(X) = infinity. This holds, for example, for any ball.
- If the 0th group is trivial but the 1th group is not, then conn_{H}(X) = 0. This holds, for example, for a connected graph with a cycle.
- If all reduced homology groups are non-trivial, then conn_{H}(X) = -1. This holds for any disconnected space.
- The connectivity of the empty space is, by convention, conn_{H}(X) = -2.

Some computations become simpler if the connectivity is defined with an offset of 2, that is, $\eta_H(X) := \text{conn}_H(X) + 2$. The eta of the empty space is 0, which is its smallest possible value. The eta of any disconnected space is 1.

== Dependence on the field of coefficients ==
The basic definition considers homology groups with integer coefficients. Considering homology groups with other coefficients leads to other definitions of connectivity. For example, X is F_{2}-homologically 1-connected if its 1st homology group with coefficients from F_{2} (the cyclic field of size 2) is trivial, i.e.: $H_1(X; \mathbb{F}_2)\cong 0$.

== Homological connectivity in specific spaces ==
For homological connectivity of simplicial complexes, see simplicial homology. Homological connectivity was calculated for various spaces, including:

- The independence complex of a graph;
- A random 2-dimensional simplicial complex;
- A random k-dimensional simplicial complex;
- A random hypergraph;
- A random Čech complex.

== Relation with homotopical connectivity ==
Hurewicz theorem relates the homological connectivity $\text{conn}_H(X)$ to the homotopical connectivity, denoted by $\text{conn}_{\pi}(X)$.

For any X that is simply-connected, that is, $\text{conn}_{\pi}(X)\geq 1$, the connectivities are the same:
$$\text{conn}_H(X) = \text{conn}_{\pi}(X)$$
If X is not simply-connected ($\text{conn}_{\pi}(X)\leq 0$), then inequality holds:
$$\text{conn}_H(X)\geq \text{conn}_{\pi}(X)$$
but it may be strict. See Homotopical connectivity.

== See also ==
Meshulam's game is a game played on a graph G, that can be used to calculate a lower bound on the homological connectivity of the independence complex of G.
