= Pinched torus =

Kind of two-dimensional surface

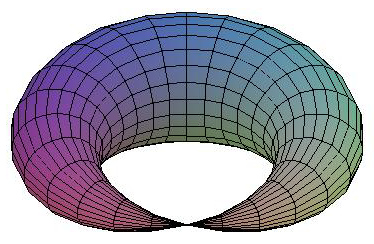
A Pinched Torus

In mathematics, and especially topology and differential geometry, a pinched torus (or croissant surface) is a kind of two-dimensional surface. It gets its name from its resemblance to a torus that has been pinched at a single point. A pinched torus is an example of an orientable, compact 2-dimensional pseudomanifold.

== Parametrisation ==
A pinched torus is easily parametrisable. Let us write g(x,y) = 2 + sin(x/2).cos(y). An example of such a parametrisation − which was used to plot the picture − is given by ƒ : [0,2π)^{2} → R^{3} where:

$$f(x,y) = \left( g(x,y)\cos x , g(x,y)\sin x , \sin\!\left(\frac{x}{2}\right)\sin y \right)$$

== Topology ==
Topologically, the pinched torus is homotopy equivalent to the wedge of a sphere and a circle. It is homeomorphic to a sphere with two distinct points being identified.

=== Homology ===
Let P denote the pinched torus. The homology groups of P over the integers can be calculated. They are given by:

$$H_0(P,\Z) \cong \Z, \ H_1(P,\Z) \cong \Z, \ \text{and} \ H_2(P,\Z) \cong \Z.$$

=== Cohomology ===
The cohomology groups of P over the integers can be calculated. They are given by:

$$H^0(P,\Z) \cong \Z, \ H^1(P,\Z) \cong \Z, \ \text{and} \ H^2(P,\Z) \cong \Z.$$
