= Simplicial approximation theorem =

Continuous mappings can be approximated by ones that are piecewise simple

In mathematics, the simplicial approximation theorem is a foundational result for algebraic topology, guaranteeing that continuous mappings can be (by a slight deformation) approximated by ones that are piecewise of the simplest kind. It applies to mappings between spaces that are built up from simplices—that is, finite simplicial complexes. The general continuous mapping between such spaces can be represented approximately by the type of mapping that is (affine-) linear on each simplex into another simplex, at the cost (i) of sufficient barycentric subdivision of the simplices of the domain, and (ii) replacement of the actual mapping by a homotopic one.

This theorem was first proved by L.E.J. Brouwer, by use of the Lebesgue covering theorem (a result based on compactness). It served to put the homology theory of the time—the first decade of the twentieth century—on a rigorous basis, since it showed that the topological effect (on homology groups) of continuous mappings could in a given case be expressed in a finitary way. This must be seen against the background of a realisation at the time that continuity was in general compatible with the pathological, in some other areas. This initiated, one could say, the era of combinatorial topology.

There is a further simplicial approximation theorem for homotopies, stating that a homotopy between continuous mappings can likewise be approximated by a combinatorial version.

== Statement ==
The basic form of the theorem is the following:

Theorem— Let $K, L$ be two simplicial complexes. If $f:|K|\to |L|$ is a continuous map, then there exists a subdivision $K'$ of $K$ and a simplicial mapping $s: K' \to L$ whose geometric realization $|s|$ is homotopic to $f$.

Also, if $f$ is a based map between pointed spaces, then $s$ and the homotopy $f \sim |s|$ can be taken to be based as well.

In short, the theorem says any continuous map between simplicial complexes is the geometric realization of a simplicial mapping up to homotopy and subdivision.

Here is a more precise formulation. A simplicial mapping $s : K \to L$ is called a simplicial approximation of $f : |K| \to |L|$ if for every point $x$ in $|K|$, $|s|(x)$ belongs to the minimal closed simplex of $L$ containing $f(x)$.

If $s$ is a simplicial approximation to a map $f$, then the geometric realization $g = |s|$ of $s$ is necessarily homotopic to $f$; in fact, the homotopy is given by $h_t = (1 - t) f + t g$.

The simplicial approximation theorem states that given a map $f : |K| \to |L|$, there exists a natural number $n_0$ such that for all $n \ge n_0$, there exists a simplicial approximation

$$s : \mathrm{Bd}^n K \to L,$$

to $f$ where $\mathrm{Bd}\; K$ denotes the barycentric subdivision of $K$, and $\mathrm{Bd}^n K$ denotes the result of applying barycentric subdivision $n$ times. In fact, the proof of the theorem shows there is a real number $\delta > 0$ depending on $f$ and $L$ (not just $|L|$) such that if each simplex in $K$ has diameter less than $\delta$, then there exists a simplicial approximation to $f$.

Moreover, if $\epsilon:|L|\to\Bbb R$ is a positive continuous map, then there are subdivisions $K',L'$ of $K,L$ and a simplicial map $s: K'\to L'$ such that $g = |s|$ is $\epsilon$-homotopic to $f$; that is, there is a homotopy $H:|K|\times[0,1]\to |L|$ from $f$ to $g$ such that $\mathrm{diam}(H(x\times[0,1]))<\epsilon(f(x))$ for all $x\in |K|$. So, we may consider the simplicial approximation theorem as a piecewise linear analog of Whitney approximation theorem.

== Applications ==
Here are some typical applications.

$$\pi_k S^n = 0, \, k < n.$$

Indeed, given a map $f : S^k \to S^n$, it is homotopic to a simplicial map $g : S^k \to S^n$. Now, for dimension reason, $g$ cannot map onto an n-simplex; i.e., $g$ is not surjective and thus the image lies in a contractible subset and $g$ is homotpic to a constant map. (Strictly speaking, here the based version of the simplicial approximation theorem is used.)

Here is another more substantial but typical application.

(Lefschetz fixed point theorem) For a compact manifold or a finite CW complex $X$, if the trace of a map $f : X \to X$ (see below) is nonzero, then $f$ admits a fixed point.

Here, for a field $\Lambda$, the trace of the map $f$ is the number (an element in $\Lambda$)

$$\operatorname{tr}(f) = \sum_i (-1)^i \operatorname{tr}(f_*|\operatorname{H}_i(X; \Lambda)),$$

which is a finite number since X has finite dimension.

Sketch of proof: We assume $f$ does not have a fixed point and shall show the trace of it is zero.

Step 1: reduces to the case when X is the geometric realization of a simplicial complex; i.e., $X = |K|$.

Indeed, X here is known to be an ENR, a Euclidean neighborhood retract. Thus, there is a retract $r : K \to X$ from a simplicial complex and $f \circ r : K \to X \to X \hookrightarrow K$ has exactly the same set of fixed points as $f$ does; so we can replace $f$ by $f \circ r$.

Step 2: $\operatorname{tr}(f_*|\operatorname{H}_*(X; \Lambda)) = \operatorname{tr}(f_*|C_*(X; \Lambda)).$

This is a linear algebra calculation.

Step 3: subdivide $K$ to $K'$ so that a simplicial approximation $g : K' \to K$ to $f$ exists and note it does not intersect a simplex in the sense below. (We shall write $g$ for both $g$ and the geometric realization of it $|g|$.)

Since $f$ does not have a fixed point and $X$ is compact, we have $\delta = \inf |x - f(x)| > 0$. Replacing $K$ by a refinement without loss of generality, we shall assume the diameter of each simplex in $K$ is $< \delta/2$; note this is not about simplicial approximation.

Let $K' \subset K$ be a subdivision so that the simplicial approximation $g : K' \to K$ exists. Then, by the definition of a simplicial approximation, for each $x$ in $X = |K'|$, $f(x), g(x)$ belong to the same closed simplex; thus, by the early assumption,

$$|f(x) - g(x)| < \delta/2.$$

It follows:

$$|x - g(x)| \ge |x - f(x)| - |f(x) - g(x)| > \delta - \delta/2 = \delta/2.$$

Thus, for each (closed) simplex $\sigma$ in $K$,

$$g(\sigma) \cap \sigma = \emptyset.$$

Final step.

Assuming $\Lambda$ is algebraically closed without loss of generality, the diagonal of the Jordan canonical form of $g_*|C_*(X; \Lambda)$ consists of all zeros. In particular, the trace of it is zero. Then by Step 2 applied to $g$, we are done since $\operatorname{tr}(f) = \operatorname{tr}(g)$ by the homotopy invariance of homology.

== Proof ==
The idea of the proof is quite intuitive; if there are sufficiently many and sufficiently randomly located vertices, then on each simplex, a continuous map can be approximated by a piecewise-linear map; thus globally so.

Precisely, let $\operatorname{St}^0(w)$ denote the open star of $w$; i.e., the union of all relatively-open simplexes containing $w$ in the closure. Note $\operatorname{St}^0(w)$ is the complement of the union of all simplexes disjoint from $\operatorname{St}^0(w)$; in particular, is an open subset and thus $U_w := f^{-1}(\operatorname{St}^0(w))$, $w$ vertices, form an open cover of $|K|$. Let $\delta$ be the Lebesgue number of this open cover; i.e., a positive real number such that if $A \subset |K|$ is a subset of diameter $< \delta$, then $A$ is contained in some open set in the cover.

Now, let $K'$ be some refinement of $K$ with the property that the diameter of each simplex in $K'$ is less than $\delta/2$ (see below for how to find such a refinement). Then the diameter of $\operatorname{St}^0(v)$ is less than $\delta$, since $|x - y| \le |x - v| + |v - y| < \delta$ for each $x, y$ in $\operatorname{St}^0(v)$. Thus, for each vertex $v$, we have $\operatorname{St}^0(v) \subset f^{-1}(\operatorname{St}^0(w))$ or

$$f(\operatorname{St}^0(v)) \subset \operatorname{St}^0(w)$$

for some vertex $w$. Let $s(v)$ denote some such $w$. Then $s$ is a map between the sets of the vertices. We note that $s$ extends by linearity to $s : K \to L$; i.e., it maps simplexes to simplexes $\Leftrightarrow$ for each set of the vertices $v_i$ of a simplex in $K$, the convex hull $\langle s(v_1), \cdots, s(v_r) \rangle$ is a (closed) simplex in $L$ $\Leftrightarrow$ for each set of the vertices $v_i$ of a simplex in $K$, there is a relatively-open simplex in $L$ whose closure contains all $s(v_i)$’s as vertices, possibly with repetition.

Now, the last condition in the above holds since given a set of the vertices $v_i$ of a simplex in $K$, we have:

$$\emptyset \ne f(\cap_i \operatorname{St}^0(v_i)) \subset \cap_i f(\operatorname{St}^0(v_i)) \subset \cap_i \operatorname{St}^0(s(v_i)).$$

And then we get the (necessary continuous) map $g = |s| : |K| \to |L|$. Next, for each $x$ in $|K|$, $f(x)$ belongs to a unique relatively-open simplex $\tau$ in $L$. Let $x = \sum \lambda_i v_i$ be a convex combination with nonzero coefficients for some vertices $v_i$ in $K.$ Then $g(x) = \sum \lambda_i g(v_i)$. Let $w_i = g(v_i)$. For each $i$, we have $x \in \operatorname{St}^0(v_i)$ and so

$$f(x) \in f(\operatorname{St}^0(v_i)) \subset \operatorname{St}^0(w_i).$$

Thus, $f(x)$ belongs to some $\tau'$ whose closure contains $w_i$ and by uniqueness, $\tau' = \tau$. Then we have

$$g(x) \in \sum \lambda_i \overline{\tau} \subset \overline{\tau}.$$

Hence, $f(x), g(x)$ belongs to the same simplex $\overline{\tau}$. So, if we let $h_t = (1 - t) f + g$, then $h_t$ is a homotopy $f \sim g$. $\square$

Here, we shall give some rigorous argument on how to find a refinement in which the diameter of each simplex is arbitrarily small (of course, this is intuitively entirely obvious.) The argument is by estimating the diameter of a simplex in a barycentric subdivision as follows.

Lemma—Let $\sigma$ be a $p$-simplex. Then each simplex in the barycentric subdivision of $\sigma$ has diameter $\le \frac{p}{p+1}\operatorname{diam}(\sigma)$. Moreover, the estimate is sharp.

Since $p/(p+1)$ is less than $1$, we can make the maximal diameter of a simplex arbitrary small by iterating barycentric subdivisions.

Proof: By construction, each simplex in the barycentric subdivision has the vertices of the form $b(F_0), \cdots$ for a chain of faces

$$\sigma = F_p  \supset \cdots \supset F_0$$

where $F < G$ means $F$ is a proper face of $G$, and, thinking $F$ consisting of vertices, the barycenter $b(F)$ of $F$ is

$$b(F) = \frac{1}{\# F} \sum_{v \in F} v.$$

Now, given faces $F < G$, with $g := \# G, f := \#F$, we have:

$$b(F) - b(G) = \frac{g - f}{g} \left(\frac{1}{f} \sum_{v \in F} v - \frac{1}{g - f}\sum_{v \in G - F} v \right).$$

Then the expression after $\frac{g - f}{g}$ is in

$$\langle v \mid v \in G \rangle + \langle -v \mid v \in G \rangle \subset \langle v - w \mid v, w \in G \rangle$$

where the bracket means convex hull. Thus, since $(g - f)/g \le (g - 1)/g \le p/(p+1)$,

$$|b(F) - b(G)| \le \frac{p}{p+1} \max_{v, w \in G} |v - w|.$$

This implies the diameter of $\langle b(F_i) \mid i \rangle$ is bounded by the claimed bound.

Finally, to see the estimate cannot be improved, first note: for the vertices $v_i$ of $\sigma$,

$$b(\sigma) - v_0 = \frac{1}{p+1}\sum_{i \ge 1} (v_i - v_0).$$

Thus, for example, if $\sigma$ is the 2-simplex with vertices $v_0 = (0, 0), v_1 = (1, 0), v_2 = (1, \epsilon)$, then the ratio $|b(\sigma) - v_0|/\operatorname{diam}(\sigma)$ approaches $\frac{2}{3}$ as $\epsilon$ goes to zero. A similar argument works in higher dimension. $\square$
