= Simplicial complex recognition problem =

Computational problem in algebraic topology

The simplicial complex recognition problem is a computational problem in algebraic topology. Given a simplicial complex, the problem is to decide whether it is homeomorphic to another fixed simplicial complex. The problem is undecidable for complexes of dimension 5 or more.

== Background ==
An abstract simplicial complex (ASC) is family of sets that is closed under taking subsets (the subset of a set in the family is also a set in the family). Every abstract simplicial complex has a unique geometric realization in a Euclidean space as a geometric simplicial complex (GSC), where each set with k elements in the ASC is mapped to a (k − 1)-dimensional simplex in the GSC. Thus, an ASC provides a finite representation of a geometric object. Given an ASC, one can ask several questions regarding the topology of the GSC it represents.

== Homeomorphism problem ==
The homeomorphism problem is: given two finite simplicial complexes representing smooth manifolds, decide if they are homeomorphic.

- If the complexes are of dimension at most 3, then the problem is decidable. This follows from the proof of the geometrization conjecture.
- For every d ≥ 4, the homeomorphism problem for d-dimensional simplicial complexes is undecidable.

The same is true if "homeomorphic" is replaced with "piecewise-linear homeomorphic".

== Recognition problem ==
The recognition problem is a sub-problem of the homeomorphism problem, in which one simplicial complex is given as a fixed parameter. Given another simplicial complex as an input, the problem is to decide whether it is homeomorphic to the given fixed complex.

- The recognition problem is decidable for the 3-dimensional sphere $S^3$. That is, there is an algorithm that can decide whether any given simplicial complex is homeomorphic to the boundary of a 4-dimensional ball.
- The recognition problem is undecidable for the d-dimensional sphere $S^d$ for any d ≥ 5. The proof is by reduction from the word problem for groups. From this, it can be proved that the recognition problem is undecidable for any fixed compact d-dimensional manifold with d ≥ 5.
- As of 2014, it is open whether the recognition problem is decidable for the 4-dimensional sphere $S^4$.

== Manifold problem ==
The manifold problem is: given a finite simplicial complex, is it homeomorphic to a manifold? The problem is undecidable; the proof is by reduction from the word problem for groups.
