= Čech complex =

Complex in algebraic topology

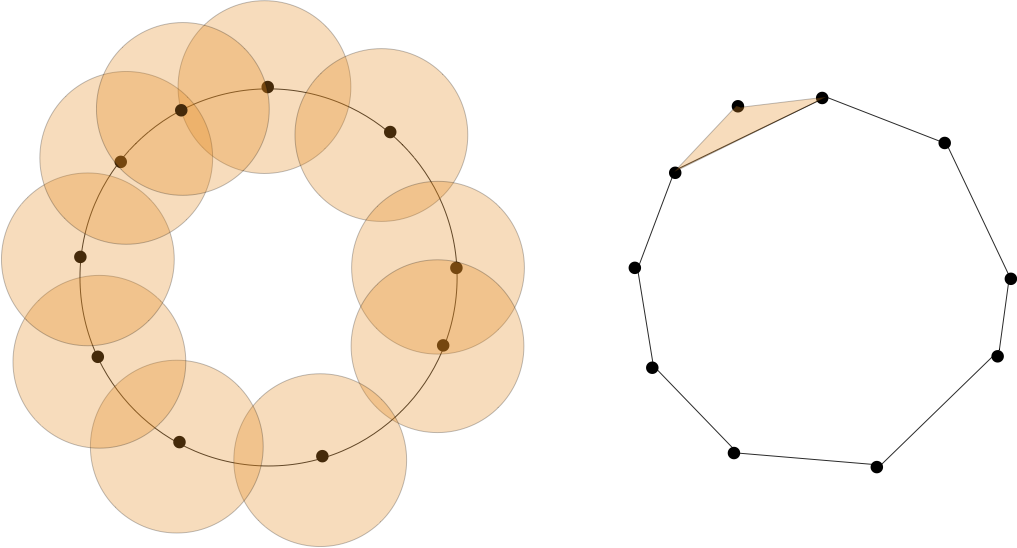
Constructing the Čech complex of a set of points sampled from a circle

In algebraic topology and topological data analysis, the Čech complex is an abstract simplicial complex constructed from a point cloud in any metric space which is meant to capture topological information about the point cloud or the distribution it is drawn from. Given a finite point cloud X and an ε > 0, we construct the Čech complex $\check C_\varepsilon(X)$ as follows: Take the elements of X as the vertex set of $\check C_\varepsilon(X)$. Then, for each $\sigma\subset X$, let $\sigma\in \check C_\varepsilon(X)$ if the set of ε-balls centered at points of σ has a nonempty intersection. In other words, the Čech complex is the nerve of the set of ε-balls centered at points of X. By the nerve lemma, the Čech complex is homotopy equivalent to the union of the balls, also known as the offset filtration.

== Relation to Vietoris–Rips complex ==
The Čech complex is a subcomplex of the Vietoris–Rips complex. While the Čech complex is more computationally expensive than the Vietoris–Rips complex, since we must check for higher order intersections of the balls in the complex, the nerve theorem provides a guarantee that the Čech complex is homotopy equivalent to union of the balls in the complex. The Vietoris–Rips complex may not be.

== See also ==
- Čech cohomology
- Computational geometry
- Simplicial complex
- Simplicial homology
