= Independence complex =

The independence complex of G

The independence complex of a graph is a mathematical object describing the independent sets of the graph. Formally, the independence complex of an undirected graph G, denoted by I(G), is an abstract simplicial complex (that is, a family of finite sets closed under the operation of taking subsets), formed by the sets of vertices in the independent sets of G. Any subset of an independent set is itself an independent set, so I(G) is indeed closed under taking subsets.

Every independent set in a graph is a clique in its complement graph, and vice versa. Therefore, the independence complex of a graph equals the clique complex of its complement graph, and vice versa.

== Homology groups ==
Several authors studied the relations between the properties of a graph G = (V, E), and the homology groups of its independence complex I(G). In particular, several properties related to the dominating sets in G guarantee that some reduced homology groups of I(G) are trivial.

1. The total domination number of G, denoted $\gamma_0(G)$, is the minimum cardinality of a total dominating set of G - a set S such that every vertex of V is adjacent to a vertex of S. If $\gamma_0(G)>k$ then $\tilde{H}_{k-1}(I(G))=0$.

2. The total domination number of a subset A of V in G, denoted $\gamma_0(G,A)$, is the minimum cardinality of a set S such that every vertex of A is adjacent to a vertex of S. The independence domination number of G, denoted $i \gamma(G)$, is the maximum, over all independent sets A in G, of $\gamma_0(G,A)$. If $i \gamma(G) > k$, then $\tilde{H}_{k-1}(I(G))=0$.

3. The domination number of G, denoted $\gamma(G)$, is the minimum cardinality of a dominating set of G - a set S such that every vertex of V \ S is adjacent to a vertex of S. Note that $\gamma_0(G)\geq \gamma(G)$. If G is a chordal graph and $\gamma(G)>k$ then $\tilde{H}_{k-1}(I(G))=0$.

4. The induced matching number of G, denoted $\mu(G)$, is the largest cardinality of an induced matching in G - a matching that includes every edge connecting any two vertices in the subset. If there exists a subset A of V such that $\gamma_0(G,A)>k+\min[k, \mu(G[A])]$ then $\tilde{H}_{k-1}(I(G))=0$. This is a generalization of both properties 1 and 2 above.

5. The non-dominating independence complex of G, denoted I'(G), is the abstract simplicial complex of the independent sets that are not dominating sets of G. Obviously I'(G) is contained in I(G); denote the inclusion map by $i: I'(G)\to I(G)$. If G is a chordal graph then the induced map $i_*: \tilde{H}_k(I'(G))\to \tilde{H}_k(I(G))$ is zero for all $k\geq -1$. This is a generalization of property 3 above.

6. The fractional star-domination number of G, denoted $\gamma^*_s(G)$, is the minimum size of a fractional star-dominating set in G. If $\gamma^*_s(G)>k$ then $\tilde{H}_{k-1}(I(G))=0$.

== Related concepts ==
Meshulam's game is a game played on a graph G, that can be used to calculate a lower bound on the homological connectivity of the independence complex of G.

The matching complex of a graph G, denoted M(G), is an abstract simplicial complex of the matchings in G. It is the independence complex of the line graph of G.

The (m,n)-chessboard complex is the matching complex on the complete bipartite graph K_{m},_{n}. It is the abstract simplicial complex of all sets of positions on an m-by-n chessboard, on which it is possible to put rooks without each of them threatening the other.

The clique complex of G is the independence complex of the complement graph of G.

== See also ==
- Rainbow-independent set
