= Pseudomanifold =

In mathematics, a pseudomanifold is a special type of topological space. It looks like a manifold at most of its points, but it may contain singularities. For example, the cone of solutions of $z^2=x^2+y^2$ forms a pseudomanifold.

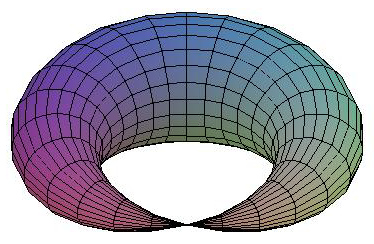
Figure 1: A pinched torus

A pseudomanifold can be regarded as a combinatorial realisation of the general idea of a manifold with singularities. The concepts of orientability, orientation and degree of a mapping make sense for pseudomanifolds and moreover, within the combinatorial approach, pseudomanifolds form the natural domain of definition for these concepts.

== Definition ==
A topological space X endowed with a triangulation K is an n-dimensional pseudomanifold if the following conditions hold:

1. (pure) X = |K| is the union of all n-simplices.
2. Every (n–1)-simplex is a face of exactly one or two n-simplices for n > 1.
3. For every pair of n-simplices σ and σ' in K, there is a sequence of n-simplices σ = σ_{0}, σ_{1}, ..., σ_{k} = σ' such that the intersection σ_{i} ∩ σ_{i+1} is an (n−1)-simplex for all i = 0, ..., k−1.

=== Implications of the definition ===
- Condition 2 means that X is a non-branching simplicial complex.
- Condition 3 means that X is a strongly connected simplicial complex.
- If we require Condition 2 to hold only for (n−1)-simplexes in sequences of n-simplexes in Condition 3, we obtain an equivalent definition only for n=2. For n≥3 there are examples of combinatorial non-pseudomanifolds that are strongly connected through sequences of n-simplexes satisfying Condition 2.

=== Decomposition ===
Strongly connected n-complexes can always be assembled from n-simplexes gluing just two of them at (n−1)-simplexes. However, in general, construction by gluing can lead to non-pseudomanifoldness (see Figure 2).

Figure 2: Gluing a manifold along manifold edges (in green) may create non-pseudomanifold edges (in red). A decomposition is possible cutting (in blue) at a singular edge

Nevertheless it is always possible to decompose a non-pseudomanifold surface into manifold parts cutting only at singular edges and vertices (see Figure 2 in blue). For some surfaces several non-equivalent options are possible (see Figure 3).

Figure 3: The non pseudomanifold surface on the left can be decomposed into an orientable manifold (central) or into a non-orientable one (on the right).

On the other hand, in higher dimension, for n>2, the situation becomes rather tricky.

- In general, for n≥3, n-pseudomanifolds cannot be decomposed into manifold parts only by cutting at singularities (see Figure 4).

Figure 4: Two 3-pseudomanifolds with singularities (in red) that cannot be broken into manifold parts only by cutting at singularities.

- For n≥3, there are n-complexes that cannot be decomposed, even into pseudomanifold parts, only by cutting at singularities.

== Related definitions ==
- A pseudomanifold is called normal if the link of each simplex with codimension ≥ 2 is a pseudomanifold.

== Examples ==
- A pinched torus (see Figure 1) is an example of an orientable, compact 2-dimensional pseudomanifold.

(Note that a pinched torus is not a normal pseudomanifold, since the link of a vertex is not connected.)

- Complex algebraic varieties (even with singularities) are examples of pseudomanifolds.

(Note that real algebraic varieties aren't always pseudomanifolds, since their singularities can be of codimension 1, take xy=0 for example.)

- Thom spaces of vector bundles over triangulable compact manifolds are examples of pseudomanifolds.
- Triangulable, compact, connected, homology manifolds over Z are examples of pseudomanifolds.
- Complexes obtained gluing two 4-simplices at a common tetrahedron are a proper superset of 4-pseudomanifolds used in spin foam formulation of loop quantum gravity.
- Combinatorial n-complexes defined by gluing two n-simplexes at a (n-1)-face are not always n-pseudomanifolds. Gluing can induce non-pseudomanifoldness.

== See also ==
- Stratified space
