= Simplicial homology =

Concept in algebraic topology

In algebraic topology, simplicial homology is the sequence of homology groups of a simplicial complex. It formalizes the idea of the number of holes of a given dimension in the complex. This generalizes the number of connected components (the case of dimension 0).

Simplicial homology arose as a way to study topological spaces whose building blocks are n-simplices, the n-dimensional analogs of triangles. This includes a point (0-simplex), a line segment (1-simplex), a triangle (2-simplex) and a tetrahedron (3-simplex). By definition, such a space is homeomorphic to a simplicial complex (more precisely, the geometric realization of an abstract simplicial complex). Such a homeomorphism is referred to as a triangulation of the given space. Many topological spaces of interest can be triangulated, including every smooth manifold (Cairns and Whitehead).

Simplicial homology is defined by a simple recipe for any abstract simplicial complex. It is a remarkable fact that simplicial homology only depends on the associated topological space. As a result, it gives a computable way to distinguish one space from another.

== Definitions ==
The boundary of a boundary of a 2-simplex (left) and the boundary of a 1-chain (right) are taken. Both are 0, being sums in which both the positive and negative of a 0-simplex occur once. The boundary of a boundary is always 0. A nontrivial cycle is something that closes up like the boundary of a simplex, in that its boundary sums to 0, but which isn't actually the boundary of a simplex or chain. Because trivial 1-cycles are equivalent to 0 in $H_1$, the 1-cycle at right-middle is homologous to its sum with the boundary of the 2-simplex at left.

=== Orientations ===
A key concept in defining simplicial homology is the notion of an orientation of a simplex. By definition, an orientation of a k-simplex is given by an ordering of the vertices, written as (v_{0}, ..., v_{k}), with the rule that two orderings define the same orientation if and only if they differ by an even permutation. Thus every simplex has exactly two orientations, and switching the order of two vertices changes an orientation to the opposite orientation. For example, choosing an orientation of a 1-simplex amounts to choosing one of the two possible directions, and choosing an orientation of a 2-simplex amounts to choosing what "counterclockwise" should mean.

=== Chains ===
Let S be a simplicial complex. A simplicial k-chain is a finite formal sum
$$\sum_{i=1}^N c_i \sigma_i, \,$$
where each c_{i} is an integer and σ_{i} is an oriented k-simplex. In this definition, we declare that each oriented simplex is equal to the negative of the simplex with the opposite orientation. For example,
$$(v_0,v_1) = -(v_1,v_0).$$

The group of k-chains on S is written C_{k}. This is a free abelian group which has a basis in one-to-one correspondence with the set of k-simplices in S. To define a basis explicitly, one has to choose an orientation of each simplex. One standard way to do this is to choose an ordering of all the vertices and give each simplex the orientation corresponding to the induced ordering of its vertices.

=== Boundaries and cycles ===
Let σ = (v_{0}, ..., v_{k}) be an oriented k-simplex, viewed as a basis element of C_{k}. The boundary operator
$$\partial_k: C_k \rightarrow C_{k-1}$$
is the homomorphism defined by:
$$\partial_k(\sigma)=\sum_{i=0}^k (-1)^i (v_0 , \dots , \widehat{v_i} , \dots ,v_k),$$
where the oriented simplex
$$(v_0 , \dots , \widehat{v_i} , \dots ,v_k)$$
is the ith face of σ, obtained by deleting its ith vertex.

In C_{k}, elements of the subgroup
$$Z_k := \ker \partial_k$$
are referred to as cycles, and the subgroup
$$B_k := \operatorname{im} \partial_{k+1}$$
is said to consist of boundaries.

=== Boundaries of boundaries ===
Because $(-1)^{i+j-1}(v_0 , \dots , \widehat{v_i} , \dots , \widehat\widehat{v_j} ,\dots , v_k) = - (-1)^{i+j}(v_0 , \dots , \widehat\widehat{v_i} , \dots , \widehat{v_j} ,\dots , v_k)$, where $\widehat\widehat{v_x}$ is the second face removed, $\partial^2 = 0$. In geometric terms, this says that the boundary of anything has no boundary. Equivalently, the abelian groups
$$(C_k, \partial_k)$$
form a chain complex. Another equivalent statement is that B_{k} is contained in Z_{k}.

As an example, consider a tetrahedron with vertices oriented as $w,x,y,z$. By definition, its boundary is given by
$$xyz - wyz + wxz - wxy.$$
The boundary of the boundary is given by
$$(yz-xz+xy)-(yz-wz+wy)+(xz-wz+wx)-(xy-wy+wx) = 0.$$

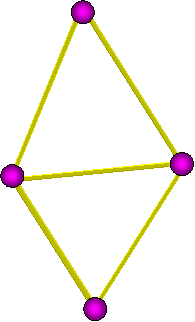
A simplicial complex with 2 1-holes

=== Homology groups ===
The kth homology group H_{k} of S is defined to be the quotient abelian group
$$H_k(S) = Z_k/B_k\, .$$

It follows that the homology group H_{k}(S) is nonzero exactly when there are k-cycles on S which are not boundaries. In a sense, this means that there are k-dimensional holes in the complex. For example, consider the complex S obtained by gluing two triangles (with no interior) along one edge, shown in the image. The edges of each triangle can be oriented so as to form a cycle. These two cycles are by construction not boundaries (since every 2-chain is zero). One can compute that the homology group H_{1}(S) is isomorphic to Z^{2}, with a basis given by the two cycles mentioned. This makes precise the informal idea that S has two "1-dimensional holes".

Holes can be of different dimensions. The rank of the kth homology group, the number
$$\beta_k = \operatorname{rank} (H_k(S))\,$$
is called the kth Betti number of S. It gives a measure of the number of k-dimensional holes in S.

== Example ==
=== Homology groups of a triangle ===
Let S be a triangle (without its interior), viewed as a simplicial complex. Thus S has three vertices, which we call v_{0}, v_{1}, v_{2}, and three edges, which are 1-dimensional simplices. To compute the homology groups of S, we start by describing the chain groups C_{k}:

- C_{0} is isomorphic to Z^{3} with basis (v_{0}), (v_{1}), (v_{2}),
- C_{1} is isomorphic to Z^{3} with a basis given by the oriented 1-simplices (v_{0}, v_{1}), (v_{0}, v_{2}), and (v_{1}, v_{2}).
- C_{2} is the trivial group, since there is no simplex like $(v_0, v_1, v_2)$ because the triangle has been supposed without its interior. So are the chain groups in other dimensions.

The boundary homomorphism ∂: C_{1} → C_{0} is given by:
$$\partial(v_0,v_1) = (v_1)-(v_0)$$
$$\partial(v_0,v_2) = (v_2)-(v_0)$$
$$\partial(v_1,v_2) = (v_2)-(v_1)$$
Since C_{−1} = 0, every 0-chain is a cycle (i.e. Z_{0} = C_{0}); moreover, the group B_{0} of the 0-boundaries is generated by the three elements on the right of these equations, creating a two-dimensional subgroup of C_{0}. So the 0th homology group H_{0}(S) = Z_{0}/B_{0} is isomorphic to Z, with a basis given (for example) by the image of the 0-cycle (v_{0}). Indeed, all three vertices become equal in the quotient group; this expresses the fact that S is connected.

Next, the group of 1-cycles is the kernel of the homomorphism ∂ above, which is isomorphic to Z, with a basis given (for example) by (v_{0},v_{1}) − (v_{0},v_{2}) + (v_{1},v_{2}). (A picture reveals that this 1-cycle goes around the triangle in one of the two possible directions.) Since C_{2} = 0, the group of 1-boundaries is zero, and so the 1st homology group H_{1}(S) is isomorphic to Z/0 ≅ Z. This makes precise the idea that the triangle has one 1-dimensional hole.

Next, since by definition there are no 2-cycles, C_{2} = 0 (the trivial group). Therefore the 2nd homology group H_{2}(S) is zero. The same is true for H_{i}(S) for all i not equal to 0 or 1. Therefore, the homological connectivity of the triangle is 0 (it is the largest k for which the reduced homology groups up to k are trivial).

=== Homology groups of higher-dimensional simplices ===
Let S be a tetrahedron (without its interior), viewed as a simplicial complex. Thus S has four 0-dimensional vertices, six 1-dimensional edges, and four 2-dimensional faces. It turns out that H_{0}(S) is isomorphic to Z, H_{2}(S) is isomorphic to Z too, and all other groups are trivial. Therefore, the homological connectivity of the tetrahedron is 0.

If the tetrahedron contains its interior, then H_{2}(S) is trivial too.

In general, if S is a d-dimensional simplex, the following holds:

- If S is considered without its interior, then H_{0}(S) = Z and H_{d}_{−1}(S) = Z and all other homologies are trivial;
- If S is considered with its interior, then H_{0}(S) = Z and all other homologies are trivial.

== Simplicial maps ==
Let S and T be simplicial complexes. A simplicial map f from S to T is a function from the vertex set of S to the vertex set of T such that the image of each simplex in S (viewed as a set of vertices) is a simplex in T. A simplicial map f : S → T determines a homomorphism of homology groups H_{k}(S) → H_{k}(T) for each integer k. This is the homomorphism associated to a chain map from the chain complex of S to the chain complex of T. Explicitly, this chain map is given on k-chains by
$$f((v_0, \ldots, v_k)) = (f(v_0),\ldots,f(v_k))$$
if f(v_{0}), ..., f(v_{k}) are all distinct, and otherwise f((v_{0}, ..., v_{k})) = 0.

This construction makes simplicial homology a functor from simplicial complexes to abelian groups. This is essential to applications of the theory, including the Brouwer fixed point theorem and the topological invariance of simplicial homology.

== Related homologies ==
Singular homology is a related theory that is better adapted to theory rather than computation. Singular homology is defined for all topological spaces and depends only on the topology, not any triangulation; and it agrees with simplicial homology for spaces which can be triangulated. Nonetheless, because it is possible to compute the simplicial homology of a simplicial complex automatically and efficiently, simplicial homology has become important for application to real-life situations, such as image analysis, medical imaging, and data analysis in general.

Another related theory is Cellular homology.

== Applications ==
A standard scenario in many computer applications is a collection of points (measurements, dark pixels in a bit map, etc.) in which one wishes to find a topological feature. Homology can serve as a qualitative tool to search for such a feature, since it is readily computable from combinatorial data such as a simplicial complex. However, the data points have to first be triangulated, meaning one replaces the data with a simplicial complex approximation. Computation of persistent homology involves analysis of homology at different resolutions, registering homology classes (holes) that persist as the resolution is changed. Such features can be used to detect structures of molecules, tumors in X-rays, and cluster structures in complex data.

More generally, simplicial homology plays a central role in topological data analysis, a technique in the field of data mining.

== Implementations ==
- Exact, efficient, computation of simplicial homology of large simplical complexes can be computed using the GAP Simplicial Homology.
- A MATLAB toolbox for computing persistent homology, Plex (Vin de Silva, Gunnar Carlsson), is available at this site.
- Stand-alone implementations in C++ are available as part of the Perseus, Dionysus and PHAT software projects.
- For Python, there are libraries such as scikit-tda, Persim, giotto-tda and GUDHI, the latter aimed at generating topological features for machine learning. These can be found at the PyPI repository.

== See also ==
- Simplicial homotopy
