= Simplicial map =

A simplicial map (also called simplicial mapping) is a function between two simplicial complexes, with the property that the images of the vertices of a simplex always span a simplex. Simplicial maps can be used to approximate continuous functions between topological spaces that can be triangulated; this is formalized by the simplicial approximation theorem.

A simplicial isomorphism is a bijective simplicial map such that both it and its inverse are simplicial.

== Definitions ==
A simplicial map is defined in slightly different ways in different contexts.

=== Abstract simplicial complexes ===
Let K and L be two abstract simplicial complexes (ASC). A simplicial map of K into L is a function from the vertices of K to the vertices of L, $f: V(K)\to V(L)$, that maps every simplex in K to a simplex in L. That is, for any $\sigma\in K$, $f(\sigma)\in L$. As an example, let K be the ASC containing the sets {1,2},{2,3},{3,1} and their subsets, and let L be the ASC containing the set {4,5,6} and its subsets. Define a mapping f by: f(1)=f(2)=4, f(3)=5. Then f is a simplicial mapping, since f({1,2})={4} which is a simplex in L, f({2,3})=f({3,1})={4,5} which is also a simplex in L, etc.

If $f$ is not bijective, it may map k-dimensional simplices in K to l-dimensional simplices in L, for any l ≤ k. In the above example, f maps the one-dimensional simplex {1,2} to the zero-dimensional simplex {4}.

If $f$ is bijective, and its inverse $f^{-1}$ is a simplicial map of L into K, then $f$ is called a simplicial isomorphism. Isomorphic simplicial complexes are essentially "the same", up to a renaming of the vertices. The existence of an isomorphism between L and K is usually denoted by $K\cong L$. The function f defined above is not an isomorphism since it is not bijective. If we modify the definition to f(1)=4, f(2)=5, f(3)=6, then f is bijective but it is still not an isomorphism, since $f^{-1}$ is not simplicial: $f^{-1}(\{4,5,6\})= \{1,2,3\}$, which is not a simplex in K. If we modify L by removing {4,5,6}, that is, L is the ASC containing only the sets {4,5},{5,6},{6,4} and their subsets, then f is an isomorphism.

=== Geometric simplicial complexes ===
Let K and L be two geometric simplicial complexes (GSC). A simplicial map of K into L is a function $f: K\to L$ such that the images of the vertices of a simplex in K span a simplex in L. That is, for any simplex $\sigma\in K$, $\operatorname{conv}(f(V(\sigma)))\in L$. Note that this implies that vertices of K are mapped to vertices of L.

Equivalently, one can define a simplicial map as a function from the underlying space of K (the union of simplices in K) to the underlying space of L, $f: |K|\to |L|$, that maps every simplex in K linearly to a simplex in L. That is, for any simplex $\sigma\in K$, $f(\sigma)\in L$, and in addition, $f\vert_{\sigma}$ (the restriction of $f$ to $\sigma$) is a linear function. Every simplicial map is continuous.

Simplicial maps are determined by their effects on vertices. In particular, there are a finite number of simplicial maps between two given finite simplicial complexes.

A simplicial map between two ASCs induces a simplicial map between their geometric realizations (their underlying polyhedra) using barycentric coordinates. This can be defined precisely. Let K, L be two ASCs, and let $f: V(K)\to V(L)$ be a simplicial map. The affine extension of $f$ is a mapping $|f|: |K|\to |L|$ defined as follows. For any point $x\in |K|$, let $\sigma$ be its support (the unique simplex containing x in its interior), and denote the vertices of $\sigma$ by $v_0,\ldots,v_k$. The point $x$ has a unique representation as a convex combination of the vertices, $x = \sum_{i=0}^k a_i v_i$ with $a_i \geq 0$ and $\sum_{i=0}^k a_i = 1$ (the $a_i$ are the barycentric coordinates of $x$). We define $|f|(x) := \sum_{i=0}^k a_i f(v_i)$. This |f| is a simplicial map of |K| into |L|; it is a continuous function. If f is injective, then |f| is injective; if f is an isomorphism between K and L, then |f| is a homeomorphism between |K| and |L|.

== Simplicial approximation ==
Let $f\colon |K| \to |L|$ be a continuous map between the underlying polyhedra of simplicial complexes and let us write $\text{st}(v)$ for the star of a vertex. A simplicial map $f_\triangle\colon K \to L$ such that $f(\text{st}(v)) \subseteq \text{st}(f_\triangle (v))$, is called a simplicial approximation to $f$.

A simplicial approximation is homotopic to the map it approximates. See simplicial approximation theorem for more details.

== Piecewise-linear maps ==
Let K and L be two GSCs. A function $f: |K|\to |L|$ is called piecewise-linear (PL) if there exist a subdivision K' of K, and a subdivision L' of L, such that $f: |K'|\to |L'|$ is a simplicial map of K' into L'. Every simplicial map is PL, but the opposite is not true. For example, suppose |K| and |L| are two triangles, and let $f: |K|\to |L|$ be a non-linear function that maps the leftmost half of |K| linearly into the leftmost half of |L|, and maps the rightmost half of |K| linearly into the rightmost half of |L|. Then f is PL, since it is a simplicial map between a subdivision of |K| into two triangles and a subdivision of |L| into two triangles. This notion is an adaptation of the general notion of a piecewise-linear function to simplicial complexes.

A PL homeomorphism between two polyhedra |K| and |L| is a PL mapping such that the simplicial mapping between the subdivisions, $f: |K'|\to |L'|$, is a homeomorphism.
