= Vietoris–Rips complex =

Topological space formed from distances

A Vietoris–Rips complex of a set of 23 points in the Euclidean plane. This complex has sets of up to four points: the points themselves (shown as red circles), pairs of points (black edges), triples of points (pale blue triangles), and quadruples of points (dark blue tetrahedrons).

In topology, the Vietoris–Rips complex, also called the Vietoris complex or Rips complex, is a way of forming a topological space from finite sets of points and the distances between them. It is an abstract simplicial complex, that is, a family of finite sets, in which one thinks of a set of $k$ points as forming a $(k-1)$-dimensional simplex: an edge for two points, a triangle for three points, a tetrahedron for four points, etc. It can be defined from any metric space $M$ and distance $\delta$ by forming a simplex for every finite set of points that has diameter no more than $\delta$. In other words, if a finite set $S$ has the property that the distance between every pair of points in $S$ is at most $\delta$, then $S$ is included as a simplex in the complex.

== History ==
The Vietoris–Rips complex was originally called the Vietoris complex, for Leopold Vietoris, who introduced it as a means of extending homology theory from simplicial complexes to metric spaces. After Eliyahu Rips applied the same complex to the study of hyperbolic groups, its use was popularized by Mikhail Gromov (1987), who called it the Rips complex. The name "Vietoris–Rips complex" is due to Jean-Claude Hausmann (1995).

== Relation to Čech complex ==
The Vietoris–Rips complex is closely related to the Čech complex (or nerve) of a set of balls, which has a simplex for every finite subset of balls with nonempty intersection. In a geodesically convex space Y, the Vietoris–Rips complex of any subspace X ⊂ Y for distance δ has the same points and edges as the Čech complex of the set of balls of radius δ/2 in Y that are centered at the points of X. However, unlike the Čech complex, the Vietoris–Rips complex of X depends only on the intrinsic geometry of X, and not on any embedding of X into some larger space.

As an example, consider the uniform metric space M_{3} consisting of three points, each at unit distance from each other. The Vietoris–Rips complex of M_{3}, for δ = 1, includes a simplex for every subset of points in M_{3}, including a triangle for M_{3} itself. If we embed M_{3} as an equilateral triangle in the Euclidean plane, then the Čech complex of the radius-1/2 balls centered at the points of M_{3} would contain all other simplexes of the Vietoris–Rips complex but would not contain this triangle, as there is no point of the plane contained in all three balls. However, if M_{3} is instead embedded into a metric space that contains a fourth point at distance 1/2 from each of the three points of M_{3}, the Čech complex of the radius-1/2 balls in this space would contain the triangle. Thus, the Čech complex of fixed-radius balls centered at M_{3} differs depending on which larger space M_{3} might be embedded into, while the Vietoris–Rips complex remains unchanged.

If any metric space X is embedded in an injective metric space Y, the Vietoris–Rips complex for distance δ and X coincides with the Čech complex of the balls of radius δ/2 centered at the points of X in Y. Thus, the Vietoris–Rips complex of any metric space M equals the Čech complex of a system of balls in the tight span of M.

== Relation to hyperbolic groups ==
The Vietoris-Rips complex of $\mathbb Z, \{-1,+1\}$, with $\delta = 2$

Equipped with the word metric relative to a generating set, a finitely generated group G is a metric space. The associated Vietoris-Rips complex is a finite-dimensional locally finite simplicial complex on which G acts geometrically, i.e. properly discontinuously and with compact quotient. This action is faithful, with finite stabilizers. Moreover, if G is torsion-free, the action if free.

When G is hyperbolic, for δ large enough the associated Vietoris-Rips complex is contractible. This implies that the group is of type F_{∞}, is finitely presented and of finite cohomological dimension.

== Relation to unit disk graphs and clique complexes ==
The Vietoris–Rips complex for δ = 1 contains an edge for every pair of points that are at unit distance or less in the given metric space. As such, its 1-skeleton is the unit disk graph of its points. It contains a simplex for every clique in the unit disk graph, so it is the clique complex or flag complex of the unit disk graph. More generally, the clique complex of any graph G is a Vietoris–Rips complex for the metric space having as points the vertices of G and having as its distances the lengths of the shortest paths in G.

== Other results ==
If M is a closed Riemannian manifold, then for sufficiently small values of δ the Vietoris–Rips complex of M, or of spaces sufficiently close to M, is homotopy equivalent to M itself.

Chambers, Erickson & Worah (2008) describe efficient algorithms for determining whether a given cycle is contractible in the Rips complex of any finite point set in the Euclidean plane.

Vietoris-Rips is closely related to Coxeter groups.

== Applications ==
As with unit disk graphs, the Vietoris–Rips complex has been applied in computer science to model the topology of ad hoc wireless communication networks. One advantage of the Vietoris–Rips complex in this application is that it can be determined only from the distances between the communication nodes, without having to infer their exact physical locations. A disadvantage is that, unlike the Čech complex, the Vietoris–Rips complex does not directly provide information about gaps in communication coverage, but this flaw can be ameliorated by sandwiching the Čech complex between two Vietoris–Rips complexes for different values of δ. An implementation of Vietoris–Rips complexes can be found in the TDAstats R package.

Vietoris–Rips complexes have also been applied for feature-extraction in digital image data; in this application, the complex is built from a high-dimensional metric space in which the points represent low-level image features.

The collection of all Vietoris–Rips complexes is a commonly applied construction in persistent homology and topological data analysis, and is known as the Rips filtration.
