= Abstract simplicial complex =

Mathematical object

Geometric realization of a 3-dimensional abstract simplicial complex

In combinatorics, an abstract simplicial complex (ASC), often called an abstract complex or just a complex, is a family of sets that is closed under taking subsets, i.e., every subset of a set in the family is also in the family. It is a purely combinatorial description of the geometric notion of a simplicial complex. For example, in a 2-dimensional simplicial complex, the sets in the family are the triangles (sets of size 3), their edges (sets of size 2), and their vertices (sets of size 1).

In the context of matroids and greedoids, abstract simplicial complexes are also called independence systems.

An abstract simplex can be studied algebraically by forming its Stanley–Reisner ring; this sets up a powerful relation between combinatorics and commutative algebra.

== Definitions ==
A collection Δ of non-empty finite subsets of a set S is called a set-family.

A set-family Δ is called an abstract simplicial complex if, for every set X in Δ, and every non-empty subset Y ⊆ X, the set Y also belongs to Δ.

The finite sets that belong to Δ are called faces of the complex, and a face Y is said to belong to another face X if Y ⊆ X, so the definition of an abstract simplicial complex can be restated as saying that every face of a face of a complex Δ is itself a face of Δ. The vertex set of Δ is defined as V(Δ) = ∪Δ, the union of all faces of Δ. The elements of the vertex set are called the vertices of the complex. For every vertex v of Δ, the set {v} is a face of the complex, and every face of the complex is a finite subset of the vertex set.

The maximal faces of Δ (i.e., faces that are not subsets of any other faces) are called facets of the complex. The dimension of a face X in Δ is defined as dim(X) = |X| − 1: faces consisting of a single element are zero-dimensional, faces consisting of two elements are one-dimensional, etc. The dimension of the complex dim(Δ) is defined as the largest dimension of any of its faces, or infinity if there is no finite bound on the dimension of the faces.

The complex Δ is said to be finite if it has finitely many faces, or equivalently if its vertex set is finite. Also, Δ is said to be pure if it is finite-dimensional (but not necessarily finite) and every facet has the same dimension. In other words, Δ is pure if dim(Δ) is finite and every face is contained in a facet of dimension dim(Δ).

One-dimensional abstract simplicial complexes are mathematically equivalent to simple undirected graphs: the vertex set of the complex can be viewed as the vertex set of a graph, and the two-element facets of the complex correspond to undirected edges of a graph. In this view, one-element facets of a complex correspond to isolated vertices that do not have any incident edges.

A subcomplex of Δ is an abstract simplicial complex L such that every face of L belongs to Δ; that is, L ⊆ Δ and L is an abstract simplicial complex. A subcomplex that consists of all of the subsets of a single face of Δ is often called a simplex of Δ. (However, some authors use the term "simplex" for a face or, rather ambiguously, for both a face and the subcomplex associated with a face, by analogy with the non-abstract (geometric) simplicial complex terminology. To avoid ambiguity, we do not use in this article the term "simplex" for a face in the context of abstract complexes).

The d-skeleton of Δ is the subcomplex of Δ consisting of all of the faces of Δ that have dimension at most d. In particular, the 1-skeleton is called the underlying graph of Δ. The 0-skeleton of Δ can be identified with its vertex set, although formally it is not quite the same thing (the vertex set is a single set of all of the vertices, while the 0-skeleton is a family of single-element sets).

The link of a face Y in Δ, often denoted Δ/Y or lk_{Δ}(Y), is the subcomplex of Δ defined by

$$\Delta/Y := \{ X\in \Delta \mid X\cap Y = \varnothing,\, X\cup Y \in \Delta \}.$$

Note that the link of the empty set is Δ itself.

=== Simplicial maps ===
Given two abstract simplicial complexes, Δ and Γ, a simplicial map is a function f that maps the vertices of Δ to the vertices of Γ and that has the property that for any face X of Δ, the image f (X) is a face of Γ. There is a category SCpx with abstract simplicial complexes as objects and simplicial maps as morphisms. This is equivalent to a suitable category defined using non-abstract simplicial complexes.

Moreover, the categorical point of view allows us to tighten the relation between the underlying set S of an abstract simplicial complex Δ and the vertex set V(Δ) ⊆ S of Δ: for the purposes of defining a category of abstract simplicial complexes, the elements of S not lying in V(Δ) are irrelevant. More precisely, SCpx is equivalent to the category where:

- an object is a set S equipped with a collection of non-empty finite subsets Δ that contains all singletons and such that if X is in Δ and Y ⊆ X is non-empty, then Y also belongs to Δ.
- a morphism from (S, Δ) to (T, Γ) is a function f : S → T such that the image of any element of Δ is an element of Γ.

== Geometric realization ==
We can associate to any abstract simplicial complex (ASC) K a topological space $|K|$, called its geometric realization. There are several ways to define $|K|$.

=== Geometric definition ===
Every geometric simplicial complex (GSC) determines an ASC: the vertices of the ASC are the vertices of the GSC, and the faces of the ASC are the vertex-sets of the faces of the GSC. For example, consider a GSC with 4 vertices {1,2,3,4}, where the maximal faces are the triangle between {1,2,3} and the lines between {2,4} and {3,4}. Then, the corresponding ASC contains the sets {1,2,3}, {2,4}, {3,4}, and all their subsets. We say that the GSC is the geometric realization of the ASC.

Every ASC has a geometric realization. This is easy to see for a finite ASC. Let $N := |V(K)|$. Identify the vertices in $V(K)$ with the vertices of an (N − 1)-dimensional simplex in $\R^N$. Construct the GSC {conv(F): F is a face in K}. Clearly, the ASC associated with this GSC is identical to K, so we have indeed constructed a geometric realization of K. In fact, an ASC can be realized using much fewer dimensions. If an ASC is d-dimensional (that is, the maximum cardinality of a simplex in it is d+1), then it has a geometric realization in $\R^{2d+1}$, but might not have a geometric realization in $\R^{2d}$ The special case d=1 corresponds to the well-known fact, that any graph can be plotted in $\R^{3}$ where the edges are straight lines that do not intersect each other except in common vertices, but not any graph can be plotted in $\R^{2}$ in this way.

If K is the standard combinatorial n-simplex, then $|K|$ can be naturally identified with Δ^{n}.

Every two geometric realizations of the same ASC, even in Euclidean spaces of different dimensions, are homeomorphic. Therefore, given an ASC K, one can speak of the geometric realization of K.

=== Topological definition ===
The construction goes as follows. First, define $|K|$ as a subset of $[0, 1]^S$ consisting of functions $t\colon S\to [0, 1]$ satisfying the two conditions:

$$\{s\in S:t_s>0\}\in K$$
$$\sum_{s\in S}t_s=1$$

Now think of the set of elements of $[0, 1]^S$ with finite support as the direct limit of $[0, 1]^A$ where A ranges over finite subsets of S, and give that direct limit the induced topology. Now give $|K|$ the subspace topology.

=== Categorical definition ===
Alternatively, let $\mathcal{K}$ denote the category whose objects are the faces of K and whose morphisms are inclusions. Next choose a total order on the vertex set of K and define a functor F from $\mathcal{K}$ to the category of topological spaces as follows. For any face X in K of dimension n, let F(X) = Δ^{n} be the standard n-simplex. The order on the vertex set then specifies a unique bijection between the elements of X and vertices of Δ^{n}, ordered in the usual way e_{0} < e_{1} < ... < e_{n}. If Y ⊆ X is a face of dimension m < n, then this bijection specifies a unique m-dimensional face of Δ^{n}. Define F(Y) → F(X) to be the unique affine linear embedding of Δ^{m} as that distinguished face of Δ^{n}, such that the map on vertices is order-preserving.

We can then define the geometric realization $|K|$ as the colimit of the functor F. More specifically $|K|$ is the quotient space of the disjoint union

$$\coprod_{X \in K}{F(X)}$$

by the equivalence relation that identifies a point y ∈ F(Y) with its image under the map F(Y) → F(X), for every inclusion Y ⊆ X.

== Examples ==
1. Let V be a finite set of cardinality n + 1. The combinatorial n-simplex with vertex-set V is an ASC whose faces are all nonempty subsets of V (i.e., it is the power set of V). If V = S = {0, 1, ..., n}, then this ASC is called the standard combinatorial n-simplex.

2. Let G be an undirected graph. The clique complex of G is an ASC whose faces are all cliques (complete subgraphs) of G. The independence complex of G is an ASC whose faces are all independent sets of G (it is the clique complex of the complement graph of G). Clique complexes are the prototypical example of flag complexes. A flag complex is a complex K with the property that every set, all of whose 2-element subsets are faces of K, is itself a face of K.

3. Let H be a hypergraph. A matching in H is a set of edges of H, in which every two edges are disjoint. The matching complex of H is an ASC whose faces are all matchings in H. It is the independence complex of the line graph of H.

4. Let P be a partially ordered set (poset). The order complex of P is an ASC whose faces are all finite chains in P. Its homology groups and other topological invariants contain important information about the poset P.

5. Let M be a metric space and δ a real number. The Vietoris–Rips complex is an ASC whose faces are the finite subsets of M with diameter at most δ. It has applications in homology theory, hyperbolic groups, image processing, and mobile ad hoc networking. It is another example of a flag complex.

6. Let $I$ be a square-free monomial ideal in a polynomial ring $S = K[x_1, \dots, x_n]$ (that is, an ideal generated by products of subsets of variables). Then the exponent vectors of those square-free monomials of $S$ that are not in $I$ determine an abstract simplicial complex via the map $\mathbf{a}\in \{0,1\}^n \mapsto \{i \in [n] : a_i = 1\}$. In fact, there is a bijection between (non-empty) abstract simplicial complexes on n vertices and square-free monomial ideals in S. If $I_{\Delta}$ is the square-free ideal corresponding to the simplicial complex $\Delta$ then the quotient $S/I_{\Delta}$ is known as the Stanley–Reisner ring of ${\Delta}$.

7. For any open covering C of a topological space, the nerve complex of C is an abstract simplicial complex containing the sub-families of C with a non-empty intersection.

== Enumeration ==
The number of abstract simplicial complexes on up to n labeled elements (that is on a set S of size n) is one less than the nth Dedekind number. These numbers grow very rapidly, and are known only for n ≤ 9; the Dedekind numbers are (starting with n = 0):

1, 2, 5, 19, 167, 7580, 7828353, 2414682040997, 56130437228687557907787, 286386577668298411128469151667598498812365 (sequence A014466 in the OEIS). This corresponds to the number of non-empty antichains of subsets of an n set.

The number of abstract simplicial complexes whose vertices are exactly n labeled elements is given by the sequence "1, 2, 9, 114, 6894, 7785062, 2414627396434, 56130437209370320359966, 286386577668298410623295216696338374471993" (sequence A006126 in the OEIS), starting at n = 1. This corresponds to the number of antichain covers of a labeled n-set; there is a clear bijection between antichain covers of an n-set and simplicial complexes on n elements described in terms of their maximal faces.

The number of abstract simplicial complexes on exactly n unlabeled elements is given by the sequence "1, 2, 5, 20, 180, 16143, 489996795, 1392195548399980210" (sequence A006602 in the OEIS), starting at n = 1.

== Computational problems ==
The simplicial complex recognition problem is: given a finite ASC, decide whether its geometric realization is homeomorphic to a given geometric object. This problem is undecidable for any d-dimensional manifolds for d ≥ 5.

== Relation to other concepts ==
An abstract simplicial complex with an additional property called the augmentation property or the exchange property yields a matroid. The following expression shows the relations between the terms:

HYPERGRAPHS = SET-FAMILIES ⊃ INDEPENDENCE-SYSTEMS = ABSTRACT-SIMPLICIAL-COMPLEXES ⊃ MATROIDS.

== See also ==
- Kruskal–Katona theorem
- Simplicial set
