= Mayer–Vietoris sequence =

Algebraic tool for computing topological spaces' invariants

In algebraic topology and homology theory, the Mayer–Vietoris sequence is an algebraic tool to help compute algebraic invariants of topological spaces. The result is due to two Austrian mathematicians, Walther Mayer and Leopold Vietoris. The method consists of splitting a space into subspaces, for which the homology or cohomology groups may be easier to compute. The sequence relates the (co)homology groups of the space to the (co)homology groups of the subspaces. It is a natural long exact sequence, whose entries are the (co)homology groups of the whole space, the direct sum of the (co)homology groups of the subspaces, and the (co)homology groups of the intersection of the subspaces.

The Mayer–Vietoris sequence holds for a variety of cohomology and homology theories, including simplicial homology and singular cohomology. In general, the sequence holds for those theories satisfying the Eilenberg–Steenrod axioms, and it has variations for both reduced and relative (co)homology. Because the (co)homology of most spaces cannot be computed directly from their definitions, one uses tools such as the Mayer–Vietoris sequence in the hope of obtaining partial information. Many spaces encountered in topology are constructed by piecing together very simple patches. Carefully choosing the two covering subspaces so that, together with their intersection, they have simpler (co)homology than that of the whole space may allow a complete deduction of the (co)homology of the space. In that respect, the Mayer–Vietoris sequence is analogous to the Seifert–van Kampen theorem for the fundamental group, and a precise relation exists for homology of dimension one.

== Background, motivation, and history ==
Similar to the fundamental group or the higher homotopy groups of a space, homology groups are important topological invariants. Although some (co)homology theories are computable using tools of linear algebra, many other important (co)homology theories, especially singular (co)homology, are not computable directly from their definition for nontrivial spaces. For singular (co)homology, the singular (co)chains and (co)cycles groups are often too big to handle directly. More subtle and indirect approaches become necessary. The Mayer–Vietoris sequence is such an approach, giving partial information about the (co)homology groups of any space by relating it to the (co)homology groups of two of its subspaces and their intersection. See § Basic versions for singular homology.

The most natural and convenient way to express the relation involves the algebraic concept of exact sequences: sequences of objects (in this case groups) and morphisms (in this case group homomorphisms) between them such that the image of one morphism equals the kernel of the next. In general, this does not allow (co)homology groups of a space to be completely computed. However, because many important spaces encountered in topology are topological manifolds, simplicial complexes, or CW complexes, which are constructed by piecing together very simple patches, a theorem such as that of Mayer and Vietoris is potentially of broad and deep applicability.

Walther Mayer was introduced to topology by his colleague Leopold Vietoris when attending his lectures in 1926 and 1927 at a local university in Vienna. He was told about the conjectured result and a way to its solution, and solved the question for the Betti numbers in 1929. He applied his results to the torus considered as the union of two cylinders. Vietoris later proved the full result for the homology groups in 1930, but did not express it as an exact sequence. The concept of an exact sequence only appeared in print in the 1952 book Foundations of Algebraic Topology by Samuel Eilenberg and Norman Steenrod, where the results of Mayer and Vietoris were expressed in the modern form.

== Basic versions for singular homology ==
Let $X$ be a topological space and $A$, $B$ be two subspaces whose interiors cover $X$. (The interiors of $A$ and $B$ need not be disjoint.) The Mayer–Vietoris sequence in singular homology for the triad $(X,A,B)$ is a long exact sequence relating the singular homology groups (with coefficient group the integers $\Z$) of the spaces $X$, $A$, $B$, and the intersection $A\cap B$. There is an unreduced and a reduced version.

=== Unreduced version ===
For unreduced homology, the Mayer–Vietoris sequence states that the following sequence is exact:
$$\cdots\to H_{n+1}(X)\,\xrightarrow{\partial_*}\,H_{n}(A\cap B)\,\xrightarrow{\left(\begin{smallmatrix}i_* \\ j_* \end{smallmatrix}\right)}\,H_{n}(A)\oplus H_{n}(B) \, \xrightarrow{k_* - l_*}\, H_{n}(X)\, \xrightarrow{\partial_*}\, H_{n-1} (A\cap B)\to \cdots$$
$$\qquad\qquad\qquad\qquad\qquad\qquad\qquad\qquad\qquad\qquad\qquad\qquad
\cdots \to H_0(A)\oplus H_0(B)\,\xrightarrow{k_* - l_*}\,H_0(X)\to 0.$$
Here $i : A\cap B \hookrightarrow A, j : A\cap B \hookrightarrow B, k : A \hookrightarrow X$ , and $l : B \hookrightarrow X$ are inclusion maps and $\oplus$ denotes the direct sum of abelian groups.

=== Boundary map ===
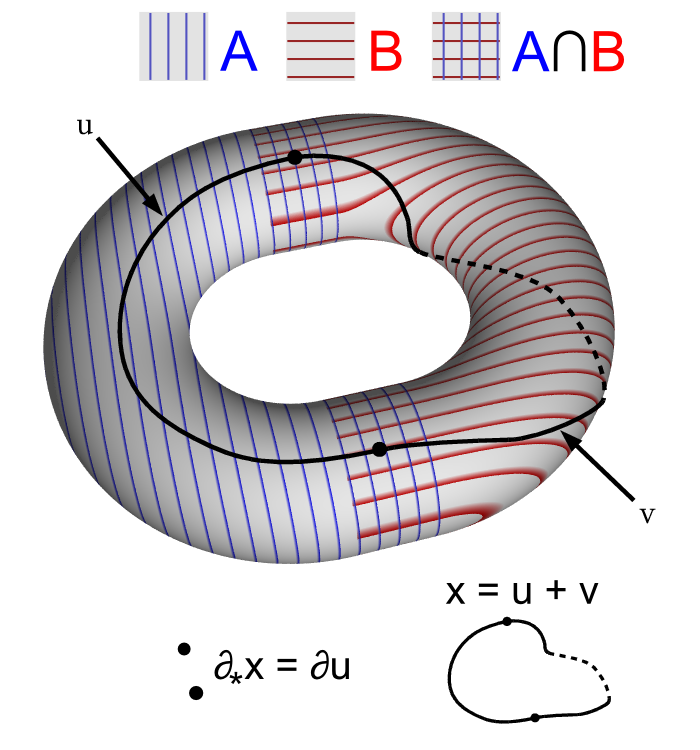
Illustration of the boundary map $\partial_*$ on the torus where the 1-cycle $x = u + v$ is the sum of two 1-chains whose boundary lies in the intersection of $A$ and $B$

The boundary maps $\partial_*$ lowering the dimension may be defined as follows. An element in $H_n(X)$ is the homology class of an $n$-cycle $x$ which, by barycentric subdivision for example, can be written as the sum of two $n$-chains $u$ and $v$ whose images lie wholly in $A$ and $B$, respectively. Thus $\partial x = \partial(u+v) = \partial u + \partial v$. Since $x$ is a cycle, $\partial x = 0$, so $\partial u = -\partial v$. This implies that the images of both these boundaries $(n-1)$-cycles are contained in the intersection $A \cap B$. Then $\partial_* ([x])$ can be defined to be the class of $\partial u$ in $H_{n-1} (A \cap B)$. Choosing another decomposition $x = u' + v'$ does not affect $[\partial u]$, since $\partial u + \partial v = \partial x = \partial u' + \partial v'$, which implies $\partial u - \partial u' = \partial(v' - v)$, and therefore $\partial u$ and $\partial u'$ lie in the same homology class; nor does choosing a different representative $x'$, since then $x' - x = \partial \phi$ for some $\phi$ in $H_{n+1} (X)$. Notice that the maps in the Mayer–Vietoris sequence depend on choosing an order for $A$ and $B$. In particular, the boundary map changes sign if $A$ and $B$ are swapped.

=== Reduced version ===
For reduced homology there is also a Mayer–Vietoris sequence, under the assumption that $A$ and $B$ have non-empty intersection. The sequence is identical for positive dimensions and ends as:
$$\cdots\to\tilde{H}_0(A\cap B)\,\xrightarrow{(i_*,j_*)}\,\tilde{H}_0(A)\oplus\tilde{H}_0(B)\,\xrightarrow{k_* - l_*}\,\tilde{H}_0(X)\to 0.$$

=== Analogy with the Seifert–van Kampen theorem ===
There is an analogy between the Mayer–Vietoris sequence (especially for homology groups of dimension 1) and the Seifert–van Kampen theorem. Whenever $A\cap B$ is path-connected, the reduced Mayer–Vietoris sequence yields the isomorphism
$$H_1(X) \cong (H_1(A)\oplus H_1(B))/\text{Ker} (k_* - l_*)$$
where, by exactness,
$$\text{Ker} (k_* - l_*) \cong \text{Im} (i_*, j_*).$$
This is precisely the abelianized statement of the Seifert–van Kampen theorem. Compare with the fact that $H_1(X)$ is the abelianization of the fundamental group $\pi_1(X)$ when $X$ is path-connected.

== Basic applications ==
=== k-sphere ===
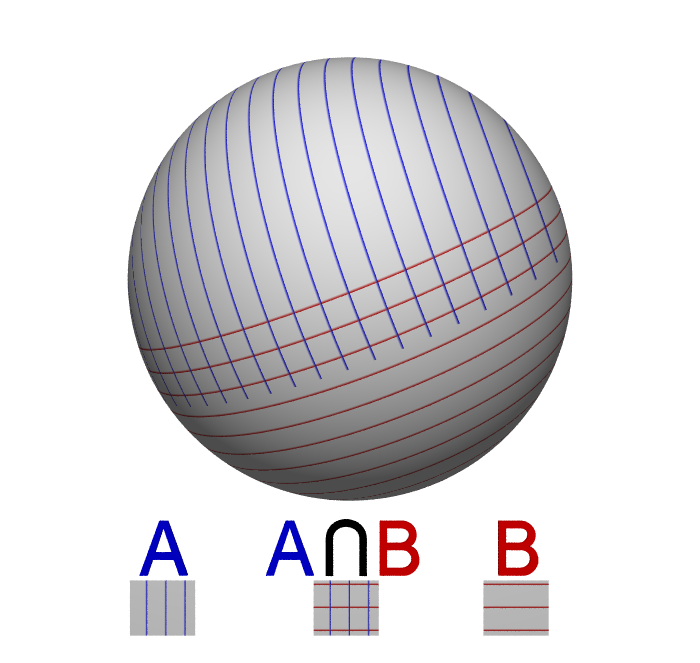
The decomposition for $X = S^2$

To completely compute the homology of the $k$-sphere $X = S^k$, let $A$ and $B$ be two hemispheres of $X$ with intersection homotopy equivalent to a $(k-1)$-dimensional equatorial sphere. Since the $k$-dimensional hemispheres are homeomorphic to $k$-discs, which are contractible, the homology groups for $A$ and $B$ are trivial. The Mayer–Vietoris sequence for reduced homology groups then yields
$$\cdots \longrightarrow 0 \longrightarrow
\tilde{H}_{n}\!\left(S^k\right)\, \xrightarrow{\overset{}{\partial_*}}\,\tilde{H}_{n-1}\!\left(S^{k-1}\right)
\longrightarrow 0 \longrightarrow \cdots$$

Exactness immediately implies that the map $\partial_*$ is an isomorphism. Using the reduced homology of the 0-sphere (two points) as a base case, it follows
$$\tilde{H}_n\!\left(S^k\right)\cong\delta_{kn}\,\mathbb{Z}=
\begin{cases}
\mathbb{Z} & \mbox{if } n=k,   \\
0 & \mbox{if } n \ne k,
\end{cases}$$
where $\delta$ is the Kronecker delta. Such a complete understanding of the homology groups for spheres is in stark contrast with current knowledge of homotopy groups of spheres, especially for the case $n > k$ about which little is known.

=== Klein bottle ===
The Klein bottle (fundamental polygon with appropriate edge identifications) decomposed as two Möbius strips $A$ (in blue) and $B$ (in red).

A slightly more difficult application of the Mayer–Vietoris sequence is the calculation of the homology groups of the Klein bottle $X$. One uses the decomposition of $X$ as the union of two Möbius strips $A$ and $B$ glued along their boundary circle (see illustration on the right). Then $A$, $B$, and their intersection $A \cap B$ are homotopy equivalent to circles, so the nontrivial part of the sequence yields
$$0 \rightarrow \tilde{H}_{2}(X) \rightarrow
\mathbb{Z}\ \xrightarrow{\overset{}{\alpha}} \ \mathbb{Z} \oplus \mathbb{Z}
\rightarrow \, \tilde{H}_1(X) \rightarrow 0$$
and the trivial part implies vanishing homology for dimensions greater than 2. The central map $\alpha$ sends $1$ to $(2,-2)$ since the boundary circle of a Möbius band wraps twice around the core circle. In particular, $\alpha$ is injective, so the homology of dimension 2 also vanishes. Finally, choosing $(1, 0)$ and $(1, -1)$ as a basis for $\mathbb{Z}_2$, it follows:
$$\tilde{H}_n\left(X\right)\cong\delta_{1n}\,(\mathbb{Z}\oplus\mathbb{Z}_2)=
\begin{cases}
\mathbb{Z}\oplus\mathbb{Z}_2 & \mbox{if } n=1,\\
0 & \mbox{if } n\ne1.    \end{cases}$$

=== Wedge sums ===
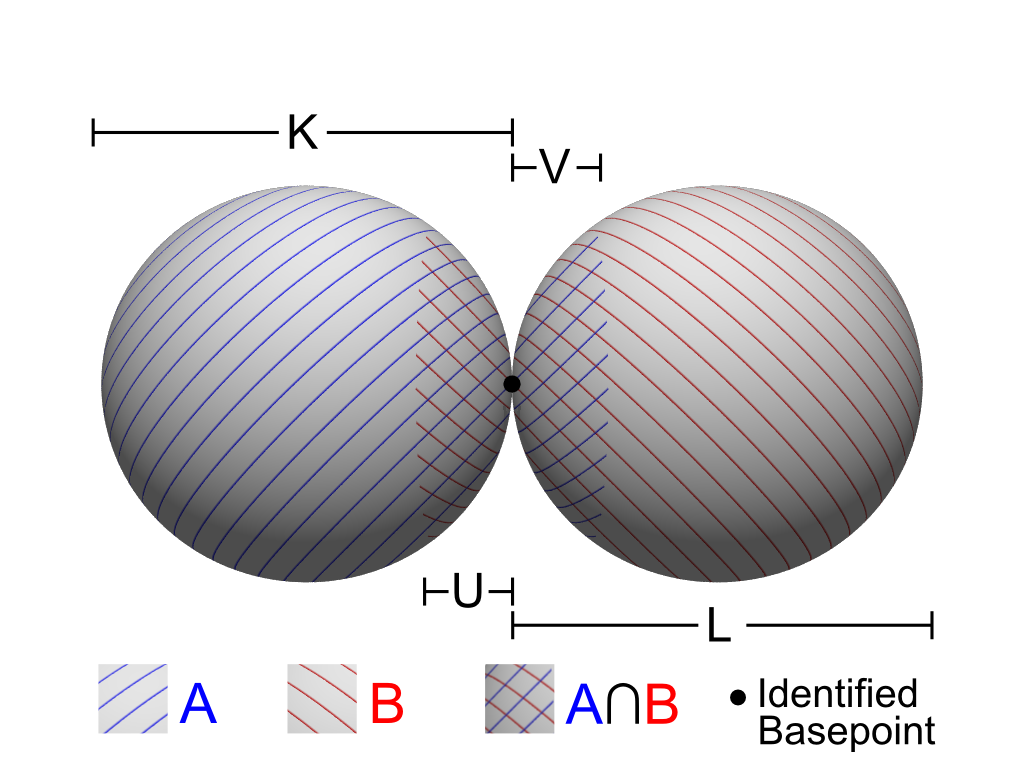
This decomposition of the wedge sum $X$ of two 2-spheres $K$ and $L$ yields all the homology groups of $X$. For this specific case, using the result from § k-sphere for 2-spheres, one has $$\tilde{H}_n\left(S^2\vee S^2\right)\cong\delta_{2n}\,(\mathbb{Z}\oplus\mathbb{Z})=\left\{\begin{matrix} \mathbb{Z}\oplus\mathbb{Z} & \mbox{if } n=2, \\ 0 & \mbox{if } n \ne 2.   \end{matrix}\right.$$

Let $X$ be the wedge sum of two spaces $K$ and $L$, and suppose furthermore that the identified basepoint is a deformation retract of open neighborhoods $U \subset K$ and $V \subset L$. Letting $A = K \cup V$ and $B = U \cup L$, it follows that $A \cup B = X$ and $A \cap B = U \cup V$, which is contractible by construction. The reduced version of the sequence then yields (by exactness)
$$\tilde{H}_n(K\vee L)\cong \tilde{H}_n(K)\oplus\tilde{H}_n(L)$$
for all dimensions $n$.

=== Suspensions ===
This decomposition of the suspension $X$ of the 0-sphere $Y$ yields all the homology groups of $X$. The illustration shows the 1-sphere $X$ as the suspension of the 0-sphere $Y$. Noting in general that the $k$-sphere is the suspension of the $(k-1)$-sphere, one can derive the homology groups of the $k$-sphere by induction, see § k-sphere.

If $X$ is the suspension $SY$ of a space $Y$, let $A$ and $B$ be the complements in $X$ of the top and bottom 'vertices' of the double cone, respectively. Then $X$ is the union $A \cup B$, with $A$ and $B$ contractible. Also, the intersection $A \cap B$ is homotopy equivalent to $Y$. Hence the Mayer–Vietoris sequence yields, for all $n$,
$$\tilde{H}_n(SY)\cong \tilde{H}_{n-1}(Y).$$

== Further discussion ==
=== Relative form ===
A relative form of the Mayer–Vietoris sequence also exists. If $Y \subset X$ and is the union of the interiors of $C \subset A$ and $D \subset B$, then the exact sequence is:
$$\cdots\to H_{n}(A\cap B,C\cap D)\,\xrightarrow{(i_*,j_*)}\,H_{n}(A,C)\oplus H_{n}(B,D)\,\xrightarrow{k_* - l_*}\,H_{n}(X,Y)\, \xrightarrow{\partial_*} \,H_{n-1}(A\cap B,C\cap D)\to\cdots$$

=== Naturality ===
The homology groups are natural in the sense that, if $f:X_1 \to X_2$ is a continuous map, then there is a canonical pushforward map of homology groups $f_*: H_k(X_1) \to H_k(X_2)$ such that the composition of pushforwards is the pushforward of a composition: that is, $(g\circ h)_* = g_*\circ h_*.$ The Mayer–Vietoris sequence is also natural in the sense that if
$$\begin{matrix} X_1 = A_1 \cup B_1 \\ X_2 = A_2 \cup B_2 \end{matrix} \qquad \text{and} \qquad \begin{matrix} f(A_1) \subset A_2 \\f(B_1) \subset B_2\end{matrix},$$
then the connecting morphism of the Mayer–Vietoris sequence, $\partial_*$, commutes with $f_*$. That is, the following diagram commutes (the horizontal maps are the usual ones):
$$\begin{matrix}
\cdots & H_{n+1}(X_1) & \longrightarrow & H_n(A_1\cap B_1) & \longrightarrow & H_n(A_1)\oplus H_n(B_1) & \longrightarrow & H_n(X_1) & \longrightarrow &H_{n-1}(A_1\cap B_1) & \longrightarrow & \cdots\\
& f_* \Bigg\downarrow & & f_* \Bigg\downarrow & & f_* \Bigg\downarrow & & f_* \Bigg\downarrow & & f_* \Bigg\downarrow\\
\cdots & H_{n+1}(X_2) & \longrightarrow & H_n(A_2\cap B_2) & \longrightarrow & H_n(A_2)\oplus H_n(B_2) & \longrightarrow & H_n(X_2) & \longrightarrow &H_{n-1}(A_2\cap B_2) & \longrightarrow & \cdots\\
\end{matrix}$$

=== Cohomological versions ===
The Mayer–Vietoris long exact sequence for singular cohomology groups with coefficient group G is dual to the homological version. It is the following:
$$\cdots\to H^{n}(X;G)\to H^{n}(A;G)\oplus H^{n}(B;G)\to H^{n}(A\cap B;G)\to H^{n+1}(X;G)\to\cdots$$
where the dimension-preserving maps are restriction maps induced from inclusions, and the (co-)boundary maps are defined in a similar fashion to the homological version. There is also a relative formulation.

As an important special case when $G$ is the group of real numbers, and the underlying topological space has the additional structure of a smooth manifold, the Mayer–Vietoris sequence for de Rham cohomology is
$$\cdots\to H^{n}(X)\,\xrightarrow{\rho}\,H^{n}(U)\oplus H^{n}(V)\,\xrightarrow{\Delta}\,H^{n}(U\cap V)\, \xrightarrow{d^*}\, H^{n+1}(X) \to \cdots$$
where $\{U,V\}$ is an open cover of $X$, $\rho$ denotes the restriction map, and $\Delta$ is the difference. The map $d^*$ is defined similarly as the map $\partial_*$ from above. It can be briefly described as follows. For a cohomology class represented by a closed $p$-form $\omega$ on $U\cap V$, choose a partition of unity $\rho_U+\rho_V=1$ subordinate to the open cover $\{U,V\}$, with $\rho_U$ supported in $U$ and $\rho_V$ supported in $V$. Then $\rho_V\omega$ extends by zero to a $p$-form on $U$, and $\rho_U\omega$ extends by zero to a $p$-form on $V$. The $(p+1)$-forms $-\,d\rho_V\wedge\omega$ on $U$ and $d\rho_U\wedge\omega$ on $V$ agree on $U\cap V$, because $d\rho_U=-\,d\rho_V$ there. Hence they glue to a global $(p+1)$-form on $X=U\cup V$, which is closed because it is locally exact (locally either as $-d(\rho_V\omega)$ or $d(\rho_U\omega)$). The connecting homomorphism $d^*$ sends $[\omega]$ to the de Rham cohomology class of this global form.

For de Rham cohomology with compact supports, there exists a "flipped" version of the above sequence:
$$\cdots\to H_{c}^{n}(U\cap V)\,\xrightarrow{\delta}\,H_{c}^{n}(U)\oplus H_{c}^{n}(V)\,\xrightarrow{\Sigma}\,H_{c}^{n}(X)\, \xrightarrow{d^*}\, H_{c}^{n+1}(U\cap V) \to \cdots$$
where $U$,$V$,$X$ are as above, $\delta$ is the signed inclusion map $\delta : \omega \mapsto (i^U_*\omega,-i^V_*\omega)$ where $i^U$ extends a form with compact support to a form on $U$ by zero, and $\Sigma$ is the sum. The connecting coboundary $d^*$ arises by writing a compactly-supported $p$-form $\omega$ on the union $X=U\cup V$ as the sum $\omega=\omega_U+\omega_V$ of a compactly supported $p$-form $\omega_U$ on $U$ and one on $V$. Because $d\omega_U+d\omega_V=0$ on the overlap, the form $\xi$ that is $d\omega_U$ on $U$ and $-d\omega_V$ on $V$ is a global closed $(p+1)$-form, and $d^*[\omega]$ is defined as $[\xi]$.

=== Derivation ===
Consider the long exact sequence associated to the short exact sequences of chain groups (constituent groups of chain complexes)
$$0 \to C_n(A\cap B)\,\xrightarrow{\alpha}\,C_n(A) \oplus C_n(B)\,\xrightarrow{\beta}\,C_n(A+B) \to 0,$$
where $\alpha(x) = (x,-x)$, $\beta(x,y) = x + y$, and $C_n (A+B)$ is the chain group consisting of sums of chains in $A$ and chains in $B$. It is a fact that the singular $n$-simplices of $X$ whose images are contained in either $A$ or $B$ generate all of the homology group $H_n (X)$. In other words, $H_n (A+B)$ is isomorphic to $H_n (X)$. This gives the Mayer–Vietoris sequence for singular homology.

The same computation applied to the short exact sequences of vector spaces of differential forms
$$0\to\Omega^{n}(X)\to\Omega^{n}(U)\oplus\Omega^{n}(V)\to\Omega^{n}(U\cap V)\to 0$$
yields the Mayer–Vietoris sequence for de Rham cohomology.

From a formal point of view, the Mayer–Vietoris sequence can be derived from the Eilenberg–Steenrod axioms for homology theories using the long exact sequence in homology.

=== Other homology theories ===
The derivation of the Mayer–Vietoris sequence from the Eilenberg–Steenrod axioms does not use the dimension axiom. Consequently, the sequence extends from ordinary theories to extraordinary or generalized (co)homology theories, such as topological K-theory and cobordism.

In modern stable homotopy theory, this is explained by Brown representability: a reduced generalized cohomology theory is represented by a spectrum $E$. Schematically, one may write
$$\widetilde E^n(X)\cong[\Sigma^\infty X,\Sigma^nE],$$
where $\Sigma^\infty X$ is the suspension spectrum of $X$ and $\Sigma^nE$ is the $n$-fold suspension (shift) of $E$. In this language, the Mayer–Vietoris sequence reflects the fact that the same excisive gluing pattern of spaces underlies each theory; what varies from one theory to another is the representing spectrum.

=== Sheaf cohomology ===
From the point of view of sheaf cohomology, the Mayer–Vietoris sequence is related to Čech cohomology. Specifically, it arises from the degeneration of the spectral sequence that relates Čech cohomology to sheaf cohomology (sometimes called the Mayer–Vietoris spectral sequence) in the case where the open cover used to compute the Čech cohomology consists of two open sets. This spectral sequence exists in arbitrary topoi.

== See also ==
- Excision theorem
- Zig-zag lemma
