= Walther Mayer =

Austrian mathematician

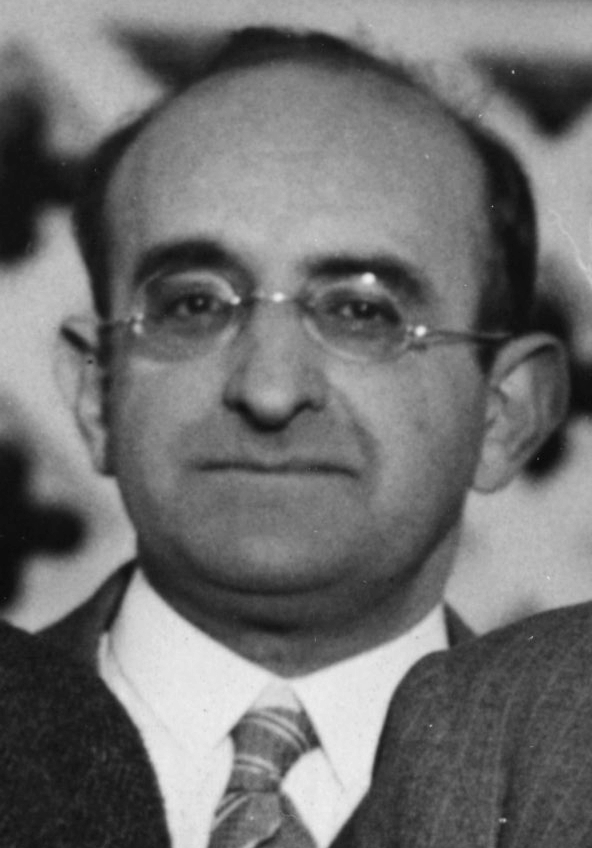
Mayer in 1931

Walther Mayer (11 March 1887 – 10 September 1948) was an Austrian mathematician, born in Graz, Austria-Hungary. With Leopold Vietoris he is the namesake of the Mayer–Vietoris sequence in topology. He served as an assistant to Albert Einstein and subsequently worked with him several years as a close collaborator, leading to the nickname "Einstein's calculator".

== Biography ==
Mayer studied at the Federal Institute of Technology in Zürich and the University of Paris before receiving his doctorate in 1912 from the University of Vienna; his thesis concerned the Fredholm integral equation. He served in the military between 1914 and 1919, during which he found time to complete a habilitation on differential geometry. Because he was Jewish, he had little opportunity for an academic career in Austria, and left the country; however, in 1926, with help from Einstein, he returned to a position at the University of Vienna as Privatdozent (lecturer). He made a name for himself in topology with the Mayer–Vietoris sequence, and with an axiomatic treatment of homology predating the Eilenberg–Steenrod axioms. He also published a book on Riemannian geometry in 1930, the second volume of a textbook on differential geometry that had been started by Adalbert Duschek with a volume on curves and surfaces.

In 1929, on the recommendation of Richard von Mises, he became Albert Einstein's assistant with the explicit understanding that he work with him on distant parallelism, and from 1931 to 1936, he collaborated with Albert Einstein on the theory of relativity. In 1933, after Hitler's assumption of power, he followed Einstein to the United States and became an associate in mathematics at the Institute for Advanced Study in Princeton, New Jersey. He continued working on mathematics at the Institute, and died in Princeton in 1948.

== Selected publications ==
- with Adalbert Duschek: Lehrbuch der Differentialgeometrie. 2 vols., Teubner 1930. vol. 1 vol. 2
- Über abstrakte Topologie. In: Monatshefte für Mathematik. vol. 36, 1929, pp. 1–42 (Mayer-Vietoris-Sequenzen)
- with T. Y. Thomas: Foundations of the theory of Lie groups. In: Annals of Mathematics. 36, 1935, 770–822.
- Die Differentialgeometrie der Untermannigfaltigkeiten des R_{n} konstanter Krümmung. Transactions of the American Mathematical Society 38 no. 2, 1935: 267–309.
- with T. Y. Thomas: Fields of parallel vectors in non-analytic manifolds in the large. Compositio Mathematica, vol. 5, 1938: pp. 198-207.
- with Herbert Busemann: "On the foundations of calculus of variations." Transactions of the American Mathematical Society 49, no. 2, 1941: 173-198
- A new homology theory. In: Annals of Mathematics. vol. 43, 1942, pp. 370–380, 594–605.
- The Duality Theory and the Basic Isomorphisms of Group Systems and Nets and Co-Nets of Group Systems. In: Annals of Mathematics. vol. 46, 1945, pp. 1–28
- On Products in Topology. In: Annals of Mathematics. vol. 46, 1945, pp. 29–57.
- Duality Theorems. In: Fundamenta Mathematicae 35, 1948, 188–202.
