= Vietoris–Begle mapping theorem =

On the homology of continuous maps between compact metric spaces

The Vietoris–Begle mapping theorem is a result in the mathematical field of algebraic topology. It is named for Leopold Vietoris and Edward G. Begle. The statement of the theorem, below, is as formulated by Stephen Smale.

== Theorem ==
Let $X$ and $Y$ be compact metric spaces, and let $f:X\to Y$ be surjective and continuous. Suppose that the fibers of $f$ are acyclic, so that

$\tilde H_r(f^{-1}(y)) = 0,$ for all $0\leq r\leq n-1$ and all $y\in Y$,

with $\tilde H_r$ denoting the $r$th reduced Vietoris homology group. Then, the induced homomorphism

$$f_*:\tilde H_r(X)\to\tilde H_r(Y)$$

is an isomorphism for $r\leq n-1$ and a surjection for $r=n$.

Note that as stated the theorem doesn't hold for homology theories like singular homology. For example, Vietoris homology groups of the closed topologist's sine curve and of a segment are isomorphic (since the first projects onto the second with acyclic fibers). But the singular homology differs, since the segment is path connected and the topologist's sine curve is not.
