= Barycentric subdivision =

Method for dividing a simplicial complex

Iterate 1 to 4 barycentric subdivisions of 2-simplices

In mathematics, the barycentric subdivision is a standard way to subdivide a given simplex into smaller ones. Its extension to simplicial complexes is a canonical method to refining them. Therefore, the barycentric subdivision is an important tool in algebraic topology.

== Motivation ==
The barycentric subdivision is an operation on simplicial complexes. In algebraic topology it is sometimes useful to replace the original spaces with simplicial complexes via triangulations: This substitution allows one to assign combinatorial invariants such as the Euler characteristic to the spaces. One can ask whether there is an analogous way to replace the continuous functions defined on the topological spaces with functions that are linear on the simplices and homotopic to the original maps (see also simplicial approximation). In general, such an assignment requires a refinement of the given complex, meaning that one replaces larger simplices with a union of smaller simplices. A standard way to carry out such a refinement is the barycentric subdivision. Moreover, barycentric subdivision induces maps on homology groups and is helpful for computational concerns, see Excision and the Mayer–Vietoris sequence.

== Definition ==
=== Subdivision of simplicial complexes ===
Let $\mathcal{S}\subset \mathbb{R}^n$ be a geometric simplicial complex. A complex $\mathcal{S'}$ is said to be a subdivision of $\mathcal{S}$ if

- each simplex of $\mathcal{S'}$ is contained in a simplex of $\mathcal{S}$
- each simplex of $\mathcal{S}$ is a finite union of simplices of $\mathcal{S'}$

These conditions imply that $\mathcal{S}$ and $\mathcal{S'}$ equal as sets and as topological spaces, only the simplicial structure changes.

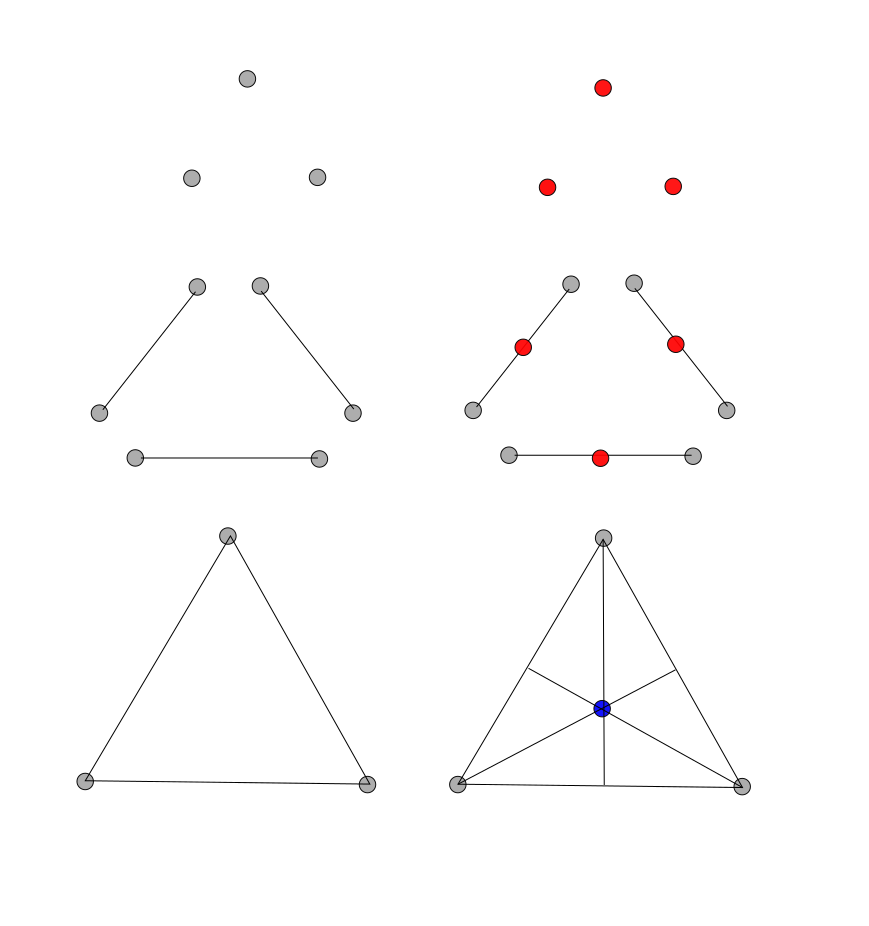
Barycentric subdivision of a 2-simplex. The colored points added on the right are the barycenters of the simplexes on the left

=== Barycentric subdivision of a simplex ===
For a simplex $\Delta$ spanned by points $p_0,...,p_n$, the barycenter is defined to be the point $b_{\Delta}= \frac{1}{n+1}(p_0+p_1+...+ p_n)$ . To define the subdivision, we will consider a simplex as a simplicial complex that contains only one simplex of maximal dimension, namely the simplex itself. The barycentric subdivision of a simplex can be defined inductively by its dimension.

For points, i.e. simplices of dimension 0, the barycentric subdivision is defined as the point itself.

Suppose then for a simplex $\Delta$ of dimension $n$ that its faces $\Delta _i$ of dimension $n-1$ are already divided. Therefore, there exist simplices $\Delta _{i,1}, \; \Delta _{i,2}..., \Delta _{i, n!}$ covering $\Delta_i$. The barycentric subdivision is then defined to be the geometric simplicial complex whose maximal simplices of dimension $n$ are each a convex hulls of $\Delta_{i,j} \cup b_{\Delta}$ for one pair $i,j$ for some $i \in {0,...,n}, \; j\in {1,...,n!}$, so there will be $(n + 1)!$ simplices covering $\Delta$.

One can generalize the subdivision for simplicial complexes whose simplices are not all contained in a single simplex of maximal dimension, i.e. simplicial complexes that do not correspond geometrically to one simplex. This can be done by effectuating the steps described above simultaneously for every simplex of maximal dimension. The induction will then be based on the $n$-th skeleton of the simplicial complex. It allows effectuating the subdivision more than once.

=== Barycentric subdivision of a convex polytope ===
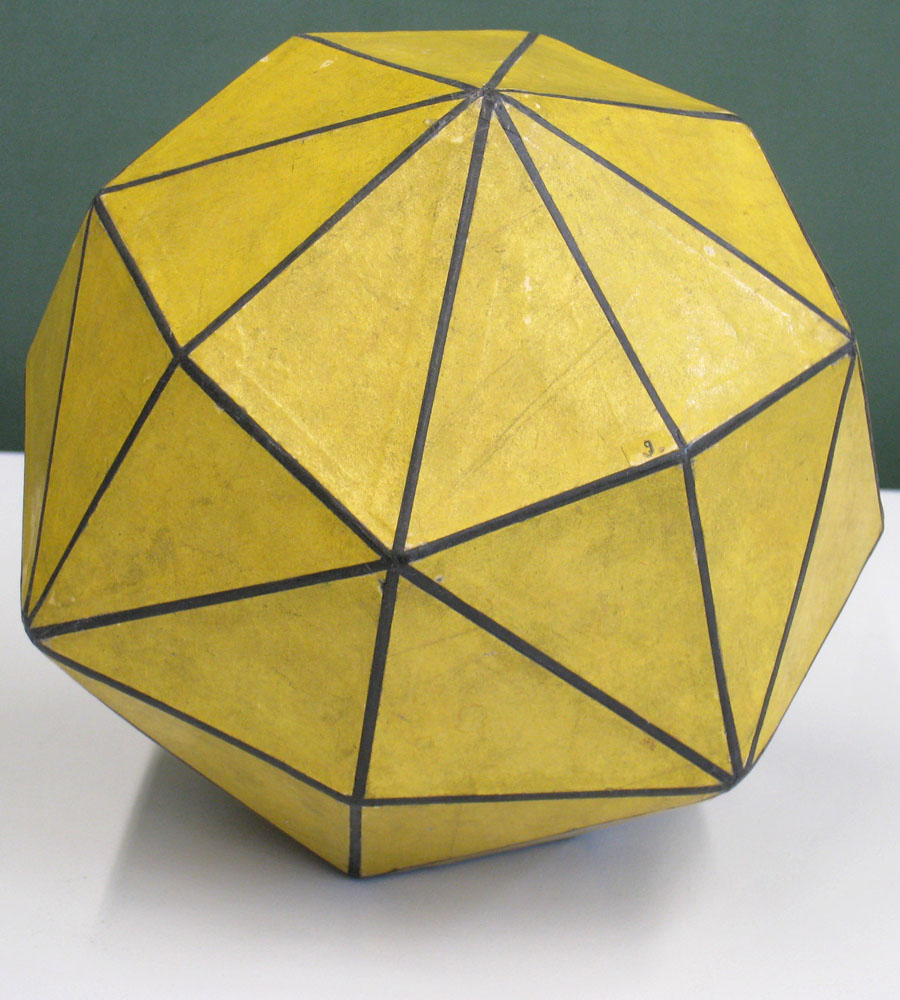
The disdyakis dodecahedron, the barycentric subdivision of a cube

The operation of barycentric subdivision can be applied to any convex polytope of any dimension, producing another convex polytope of the same dimension. In this version of barycentric subdivision, it is not necessary for the polytope to form a simplicial complex: it can have faces that are not simplices. This is the dual operation to omnitruncation. The vertices of the barycentric subdivision correspond to the faces of all dimensions of the original polytope. Two vertices are adjacent in the barycentric subdivision when they correspond to two faces of different dimensions with the lower-dimensional face included in the higher-dimensional face. The facets of the barycentric subdivision are simplices, corresponding to the flags of the original polytope.

For instance, the barycentric subdivision of a cube, or of a regular octahedron, is the disdyakis dodecahedron. The degree-6, degree-4, and degree-8 vertices of the disdyakis dodecahedron correspond to the vertices, edges, and square facets of the cube, respectively.

== Properties ==
=== Mesh ===
Let $\Delta \subset \mathbb{R}^n$ a simplex and define $\operatorname{diam}(\Delta) = \operatorname{max} \Bigl\{ \|a-b\|_{\mathbb{R}^n} \; \Big|\; a, b \in \Delta \Bigr\}$. One way to measure the mesh of a geometric, simplicial complex is to take the maximal diameter of the simplices contained in the complex. Let $\Delta'$ be an $n$- dimensional simplex that comes from the covering of $\Delta$ obtained by the barycentric subdivision. Then, the following estimation holds:

$\operatorname{diam}(\Delta')\leq \left(\frac{n}{n+1}\right)\; \operatorname{diam}(\Delta)$. Therefore, by applying barycentric subdivision sufficiently often, the largest edge can be made as small as desired.

=== Homology ===
For some statements in homology-theory one wishes to replace simplicial complexes by a subdivision. On the level of simplicial homology groups one requires a map from the homology-group of the original simplicial complex to the groups of the subdivided complex. Indeed it can be shown that for any subdivision $\mathcal{K'}$ of a finite simplicial complex $\mathcal{K}$ there is a unique sequence of maps between the homology groups $\lambda_n: C_n(\mathcal{K})\rightarrow C_n(\mathcal{K'})$ such that for each $\Delta$ in $\mathcal{K}$ the maps fulfills $\lambda(\Delta)\subset \Delta$ and such that the maps induces endomorphisms of chain complexes. Moreover, the induced map is an isomorphism: Subdivision does not change the homology of the complex.

To compute the singular homology groups of a topological space $X$ one considers continuous functions $\sigma: \Delta^n \rightarrow X$ where $\Delta^n$ denotes the $n$-dimensional-standard-simplex. In an analogous way as described for simplicial homology groups, barycentric subdivision can be interpreted as an endomorphism of singular chain complexes. Here again, there exists a subdivision operator $\lambda_n: C_n(X)\rightarrow C_n(X)$ sending a chain $\sigma: \Delta \rightarrow X$ to a linear combination $\sum \varepsilon_{B_{\Delta}} \sigma\vert_{B_{\Delta}}$ where the sum runs over all simplices $B_{\Delta}$ that appear in the covering of $\Delta$ by barycentric subdivision, and $\varepsilon_{B_{\Delta}}\in \{1, -1\}$ for all of such $B_{\Delta}$. This map also induces an endomorphism of chain complexes.

== Applications ==
The barycentric subdivision can be applied on whole simplicial complexes as in the simplicial approximation theorem or it can be used to subdivide geometric simplices. Therefore it is crucial for statements in singular homology theory, see Mayer–Vietoris sequence and excision.

=== Simplicial approximation ===
Let $\mathcal{K}$, $\mathcal{L}$ be abstract simplicial complexes above sets $V_K$, $V_L$. A simplicial map is a function $f:V_K \rightarrow V_L$ which maps each simplex in $\mathcal{K}$ onto a simplex in $\mathcal{L}$. By affin-linear extension on the simplices, $f$ induces a map between the geometric realizations of the complexes. Each point in a geometric complex lies in the inner of exactly one simplex, its support. Consider now a continuous map $f:\mathcal{K}\rightarrow \mathcal{L}$. A simplicial map $g:\mathcal{K}\rightarrow \mathcal{L}$ is said to be a simplicial approximation of $f$ if and only if each $x \in \mathcal{K}$ is mapped by $g$ onto the support of $f(x)$ in $\mathcal{L}$. If such an approximation exists, one can construct a homotopy $H$ transforming $f$ into $g$ by defining it on each simplex; there, it always exists, because simplices are contractible.

The simplicial approximation theorem guarantees for every continuous function $f:V_K \rightarrow V_L$ the existence of a simplicial approximation at least after refinement of $\mathcal{K}$, for instance by replacing $\mathcal{K}$ by its iterated barycentric subdivision. The theorem plays an important role for certain statements in algebraic topology in order to reduce the behavior of continuous maps on those of simplicial maps, as for instance in Lefschetz's fixed-point theorem.

==== Lefschetz's fixed-point theorem ====
The Lefschetz number is a useful tool to find out whether a continuous function admits fixed-points. This data is computed as follows: Suppose that $X$ and $Y$ are topological spaces that admit finite triangulations. A continuous map $f: X\rightarrow Y$ induces homomorphisms $f_i: H_i(X,K)\rightarrow H_i(Y,K)$ between its simplicial homology groups with coefficients in a field $K$. These are linear maps between $K$- vectorspaces, so their trace $tr_i$ can be determined and their alternating sum

$L_K(f)= \sum_i(-1)^itr_i(f) \in K$

is called the Lefschetz number of $f$. If $f = id$, this number is the Euler characteristic of $K$. The fixpoint theorem states that whenever $L_K(f)\neq 0$, $f$ has a fixed-point. In the proof this is first shown only for simplicial maps and then generalized for any continuous functions via the approximation theorem.

Now, Brouwer's fixpoint theorem is a special case of this statement. Let $f:\mathbb{D}^n \rightarrow \mathbb{D}^n$ is an endomorphism of the unit-ball. For $k \geq 1$ all its homology groups $H_k(\mathbb{D}^n)$ vanish, and $f_0$ is always the identity, so $L_K(f) = tr_0(f) = 1 \neq 0$, so $f$ has a fixpoint.

=== Mayer–Vietoris sequence ===
The Mayer–Vietoris sequence is often used to compute singular homology groups and gives rise to inductive arguments in topology. The related statement can be formulated as follows:

Let $X = A \cup B$ an open cover of the topological space $X$ .

There is an exact sequence

$$\cdots\to H_{n+1}(X)\,\xrightarrow{\partial_*}\,H_{n}(A\cap B)\,\xrightarrow{(i_*,j_*)}\,H_{n}(A)\oplus H_{n}(B) \, \xrightarrow{k_* - l_*}\, H_{n}(X)\, \xrightarrow{\partial_*}\, H_{n-1} (A\cap B)\to \cdots$$
$$\qquad\qquad\qquad\qquad\qquad\qquad\qquad\qquad\qquad\qquad\qquad\qquad
\cdots \to H_0(A)\oplus H_0(B)\,\xrightarrow{k_* - l_*}\,H_0(X)\to 0.$$

where we consider singular homology groups, $i: A \cap B \hookrightarrow A, \; j: A \cap B \hookrightarrow B, \; k: A \hookrightarrow X, \; l: B \hookrightarrow X$ are embeddings and $\oplus$ denotes the direct sum of abelian groups.

For the construction of singular homology groups one considers continuous maps defined on the standard simplex $\sigma: \Delta \rightarrow X$. An obstacle in the proof of the theorem are maps $\sigma$ such that their image is nor contained in $A$ neither in $B$. This can be fixed using the subdivision operator: By considering the images of such maps as the sum of images of smaller simplices, lying in $A$ or $B$ one can show that the inclusion $C_n(A)\oplus C_n(B)\hookrightarrow C_n(X)$ induces an isomorphism on homology which is needed to compare the homology groups.

=== Excision ===
Excision can be used to determine relative homology groups. It allows in certain cases to forget about subsets of topological spaces for their homology groups and therefore simplifies their computation:

Let $X$ be a topological space and let $Z \subset A \subset X$ be subsets, where $Z$ is closed such that $Z \subset A^{\circ}$. Then the inclusion $i:(X \setminus Z, A \setminus Z) \hookrightarrow (X, A)$ induces an isomorphism $H_k(X \setminus Z, A \setminus Z) \rightarrow H_k(X,A)$ for all $k \geq 0.$

Again, in singular homology, maps $\sigma: \Delta \rightarrow X$ may appear such that their image is not part of the subsets mentioned in the theorem. Analogously those can be understood as a sum of images of smaller simplices obtained by the barycentric subdivision.
