= Relative homology =

Homology for a pair of topological spaces

In algebraic topology, a branch of mathematics, the (singular) homology of a topological space relative to a subspace is a construction in singular homology, for pairs of spaces. The relative homology is useful and important in several ways. Intuitively, it helps determine what part of an absolute homology group comes from which subspace.

== Definition ==
Given a subspace $A\subseteq X$, one may form the short exact sequence

$$0\to C_\bullet(A) \to C_\bullet(X)\to
C_\bullet(X) /C_\bullet(A)  \to 0 ,$$

where $C_\bullet(X)$ denotes the singular chains on the space X. The boundary map on $C_\bullet(X)$ descends^{a} to $C_\bullet(A)$ and therefore induces a boundary map $\partial'_\bullet$ on the quotient. If we denote this quotient by $C_n(X,A):=C_n(X)/C_n(A)$, we then have a complex

$$\cdots\longrightarrow C_n(X,A) \xrightarrow{\partial'_n} C_{n-1}(X,A) \longrightarrow \cdots .$$

By definition, the n^{th} relative homology group of the pair of spaces $(X,A)$ is

$$H_n(X,A) := \ker\partial'_n/\operatorname{im}\partial'_{n+1}.$$

One says that relative homology is given by the relative cycles, chains whose boundaries are chains on A, modulo the relative boundaries (chains that are homologous to a chain on A, i.e., chains that would be boundaries, modulo A again).

== Properties ==
The above short exact sequences specifying the relative chain groups give rise to a chain complex of short exact sequences. An application of the snake lemma then yields a long exact sequence

$$\cdots \to H_n(A) \stackrel{i_*}{\to} H_n(X) \stackrel{j_*}{\to} H_n (X,A) \stackrel{\partial}{\to} H_{n-1}(A)  \to \cdots .$$

The connecting map $\partial$ takes a relative cycle, representing a homology class in $H_n(X,A)$, to its boundary (which is a cycle in A).

It follows that $H_n(X,x_0)$, where $x_0$ is a point in X, is the n-th reduced homology group of X. In other words, $H_i(X,x_0) = H_i(X)$ for all $i > 0$. When $i = 0$, $H_0(X,x_0)$ is the free module of one rank less than $H_0(X)$. The connected component containing $x_0$ becomes trivial in relative homology.

The excision theorem says that removing a sufficiently nice subset $Z \subset A$ leaves the relative homology groups $H_n(X,A)$ unchanged. If $A$ has a neighbourhood $V$ in $X$ that deformation retracts to $A$, then using the long exact sequence of pairs and the excision theorem, one can show that $H_n(X,A)$ is the same as the n-th reduced homology groups of the quotient space $X/A$. This property is particularly important as it relates algebraic quotients and topological quotients.

Relative homology readily extends to the triple $(X,Y,Z)$ for $Z \subset Y \subset X$.

One can define the Euler characteristic for a pair $Y \subset X$ by

$$\chi (X, Y) = \sum _{j=0} ^n (-1)^j \operatorname{rank} H_j (X, Y) .$$

The exactness of the sequence implies that the Euler characteristic is additive, i.e., if $Z \subset Y \subset X$, one has

$$\chi (X, Z) = \chi (X, Y) + \chi (Y, Z) .$$

== Local homology ==
The $n$-th local homology group of a space $X$ at a point $x_0$, denoted

$$H_{n,\{x_0\}}(X)$$

is defined to be the relative homology group $H_n(X,X\setminus \{x_0\})$. Informally, this is the "local" homology of $X$ close to $x_0$.

=== Local homology of the cone CX at the origin ===
One easy example of local homology is calculating the local homology of the cone of a space at the origin of the cone. Recall that the cone is defined as the quotient space

$$CX = (X\times I)/(X\times\{0\}) ,$$

where $X \times \{0\}$ has the subspace topology. Then, the origin $x_0 = 0$ is the equivalence class of points $[X\times 0]$. Using the intuition that the local homology group $H_{*,\{x_0\}}(CX)$ of $CX$ at $x_0$ captures the homology of $CX$ "near" the origin, we should expect this is the homology of $H_*(X)$ since $CX \setminus \{x_0\}$ has a homotopy retract to $X$. Computing the local homology can then be done using the long exact sequence in homology

$$\begin{align}
\to &H_n(CX\setminus \{x_0 \})\to H_n(CX) \to H_{n,\{x_{0}\}}(CX)\\
\to & H_{n-1}(CX\setminus \{x_0 \})\to H_{n-1}(CX) \to H_{n-1,\{x_{0}\}}(CX).
\end{align}$$

Because the cone of a space is contractible, the middle homology groups are all zero, giving the isomorphism

$$\begin{align}
H_{n,\{x_0\}}(CX) & \cong
H_{n-1}(CX \setminus \{ x_0 \}) \\
& \cong H_{n-1}(X),
\end{align}$$

since $CX \setminus \{x_0\}$ deformation retracts to $X$.

Another way to see this is by noting that the quotient topology of $CX$ by $CX \setminus \{x_0\}$ is homotopic to $SX$, the suspension of $X$, thus giving $H_{n,\{x_0\}}(CX) \cong H_{n}(SX) \cong H_{n-1}(X)$

==== In algebraic geometry ====
Note the previous construction can be proven in algebraic geometry using the affine cone of a projective variety $X$ using Local cohomology.

=== Local homology of a point on a smooth manifold ===
Another computation for local homology can be computed on a point $p$ of a manifold $M$. Then, let $K$ be a compact neighborhood of $p$ isomorphic to a closed disk $\mathbb{D}^n = \{ x \in \R^n : |x| \leq 1 \}$ and let $U = M \setminus K$. Using the excision theorem there is an isomorphism of relative homology groups

$$\begin{align}
H_n(M,M\setminus\{p\}) &\cong H_n(M\setminus U, M\setminus (U\cup \{p\})) \\
&= H_n(K, K\setminus\{p\}),
\end{align}$$

hence the local homology of a point reduces to the local homology of a point in a closed ball $\mathbb{D}^n$. Because of the homotopy equivalence

$$\mathbb{D}^n \setminus \{0\} \simeq S^{n-1}$$

and the fact

$$H_k(\mathbb{D}^n) \cong \begin{cases}
\Z & k = 0 \\
0 & k \neq 0 ,
\end{cases}$$

the only non-trivial part of the long exact sequence of the pair $(\mathbb{D},\mathbb{D}\setminus\{0\})$ is

$$0 \to H_{n,\{0\}}(\mathbb{D}^n) \to H_{n-1}(S^{n-1}) \to 0 ,$$

hence the only non-zero local homology group is $H_{n,\{0\}}(\mathbb{D}^n)$.

== Functoriality ==
Just as in absolute homology, continuous maps between spaces induce homomorphisms between relative homology groups. In fact, this map is exactly the induced map on homology groups, but it descends to the quotient.

Let $(X,A)$ and $(Y,B)$ be pairs of spaces such that $A\subseteq X$ and $B\subseteq Y$, and let $f\colon X\to Y$ be a continuous map. Then there is an induced map $f_\#\colon C_n(X)\to C_n(Y)$ on the (absolute) chain groups. If $f(A)\subseteq B$, then $f_\#(C_n(A))\subseteq C_n(B)$. Let

$$\begin{align}
\pi_X&:C_n(X)\longrightarrow C_n(X)/C_n(A) \\
\pi_Y&:C_n(Y)\longrightarrow C_n(Y)/C_n(B) \\
\end{align}$$

be the natural projections which take elements to their equivalence classes in the quotient groups. Then the map $\pi_Y\circ f_\#\colon C_n(X)\to C_n(Y)/C_n(B)$ is a group homomorphism. Since $f_\#(C_n(A))\subseteq C_n(B)=\ker\pi_Y$, this map descends to the quotient, inducing a well-defined map $\varphi\colon C_n(X)/C_n(A)\to C_n(Y)/C_n(B)$ such that the following diagram commutes:

Chain maps induce homomorphisms between homology groups, so $f$ induces a map $f_*\colon H_n(X,A)\to H_n(Y,B)$ on the relative homology groups.

== Examples ==
One important use of relative homology is the computation of the homology groups of quotient spaces $X/A$. In the case that $A$ is a subspace of $X$ fulfilling the mild regularity condition that there exists a neighborhood of $A$ that has $A$ as a deformation retract, then the group $\tilde H_n(X/A)$ is isomorphic to $H_n(X,A)$. We can immediately use this fact to compute the homology of a sphere. We can realize $S^n$ as the quotient of an n-disk by its boundary, i.e. $S^n = D^n/S^{n-1}$. Applying the exact sequence of relative homology gives the following:

$$\cdots\to \tilde H_n(D^n)\rightarrow H_n(D^n,S^{n-1})\rightarrow \tilde H_{n-1}(S^{n-1})\rightarrow \tilde H_{n-1}(D^n)\to \cdots.$$

Because the disk is contractible, we know its reduced homology groups vanish in all dimensions, so the above sequence collapses to the short exact sequence:

$$0\rightarrow H_n(D^n,S^{n-1}) \rightarrow \tilde H_{n-1}(S^{n-1}) \rightarrow 0.$$

Therefore, we get isomorphisms $H_n(D^n,S^{n-1})\cong \tilde H_{n-1}(S^{n-1})$. We can now proceed by induction to show that $H_n(D^n,S^{n-1})\cong \Bbb{Z}$. Now because $S^{n-1}$ is the deformation retract of a suitable neighborhood of itself in $D^n$, we get that $H_n(D^n,S^{n-1})\cong \tilde H_n(S^n)\cong \Z$.

Another insightful geometric example is given by the relative homology of $(X=\Complex^*, D = \{1,\alpha\})$ where $\alpha \neq 0, 1$. Then we can use the long exact sequence

$$\begin{align}
0 &\to H_1(D)\to H_1(X) \to H_1(X,D) \\
& \to H_0(D)\to H_0(X) \to H_0(X,D)
\end{align}
=
\begin{align}
0 & \to 0 \to \Z \to H_1(X,D) \\
& \to \Z^{\oplus 2} \to \Z \to 0
\end{align}$$

Using exactness of the sequence we can see that $H_1(X,D)$ contains a loop $\sigma$ counterclockwise around the origin. Since the cokernel of $\phi\colon \Z \to H_1(X,D)$ fits into the exact sequence

$$0 \to \operatorname{coker}(\phi) \to \Z^{\oplus 2} \to \Z \to 0$$

it must be isomorphic to $\Z$. One generator for the cokernel is the $1$-chain $[1,\alpha]$ since its boundary map is

$$\partial([1,\alpha]) = [\alpha] - [1]$$

== See also ==
- Excision theorem
- Mayer–Vietoris sequence

== Notes ==
i.e., the boundary $\partial\colon C_n(X)\to C_{n-1}(X)$ maps $C_n(A)$ to $C_{n-1}(A)$
