= Eilenberg–Steenrod axioms =

Properties that homology theories of topological spaces have in common

In mathematics, specifically in algebraic topology, the Eilenberg–Steenrod axioms are properties that homology theories of topological spaces have in common. The quintessential example of a homology theory satisfying the axioms is singular homology, developed by Samuel Eilenberg and Norman Earl Steenrod.

One can define a homology theory as a sequence of functors satisfying the Eilenberg–Steenrod axioms. The axiomatic approach, which was developed in 1945, allows one to prove results, such as the Mayer–Vietoris sequence, that are common to all homology theories satisfying the axioms.

If one omits the dimension axiom (described below), then the remaining axioms define what is called an extraordinary homology theory. Extraordinary cohomology theories first arose in K-theory and cobordism.

== Formal definition ==
The Eilenberg–Steenrod axioms apply to a sequence of functors $H_n$ from the category of pairs $(X,A)$ of topological spaces to the category of abelian groups, together with a natural transformation $\partial \colon H_{i}(X, A) \to H_{i-1}(A)$ called the boundary map (here $H_{i-1}(A)$ is a shorthand for $H_{i-1}(A,\varnothing)$ ). The axioms are:

1. Homotopy: Homotopic maps induce the same map in homology. That is, if $g\colon (X, A) \rightarrow (Y,B)$ is homotopic to $h\colon (X, A) \rightarrow (Y,B)$, then their induced homomorphisms are the same.
2. Excision: If $(X,A)$ is a pair and U is a subset of A such that the closure of U is contained in the interior of A, then the inclusion map $i\colon (X\setminus U, A\setminus U) \to (X, A)$ induces an isomorphism in homology.
3. Dimension: Let P be the one-point space; then $H_n(P) = 0$ for all $n \neq 0$.
4. Additivity: If $X = \coprod_{\alpha}{X_{\alpha}}$, the disjoint union of a family of topological spaces $X_{\alpha}$, then $H_n(X) \cong \bigoplus_{\alpha} H_n(X_{\alpha}).$
5. Exactness: Each pair (X, A) induces a long exact sequence in homology, via the inclusions $i\colon A \to X$ and $j\colon X \to (X, A)$:

$$\cdots \to H_n(A) \,\xrightarrow{i_*}\, H_n(X) \,\xrightarrow{j_*}\, H_n (X,A) \,\xrightarrow{\partial}\, H_{n-1}(A) \to \cdots.$$

If P is the one point space, then $H_0(P)$ is called the coefficient group. For example, singular homology (taken with integer coefficients, as is most common) has as coefficients the integers.

== Consequences ==
Some facts about homology groups can be derived directly from the axioms, such as the fact that homotopically equivalent spaces have isomorphic homology groups.

The homology of some relatively simple spaces, such as n-spheres, can be calculated directly from the axioms. From this it can be easily shown that the (n − 1)-sphere is not a retract of the n-disk. This is used in a proof of the Brouwer fixed point theorem.

== Dimension axiom ==
A "homology-like" theory satisfying all of the Eilenberg–Steenrod axioms except the dimension axiom is called an extraordinary homology theory (dually, extraordinary cohomology theory). Important examples of these were found in the 1950s, such as topological K-theory and cobordism theory, which are extraordinary cohomology theories, and come with homology theories dual to them.

== See also ==
- Zig-zag lemma
