= Graph (topology) =

Topological space arising from a usual graph

In topology, a branch of mathematics, a graph is a topological space which arises from a usual graph $G = (E, V)$ by replacing vertices by points and each edge $e = xy \in E$ by a copy of the unit interval $I = [0,1]$, where $0$ is identified with the point associated to $x$ and $1$ with the point associated to $y$. That is, as topological spaces, graphs are exactly the simplicial 1-complexes and also exactly the one-dimensional CW complexes.

Thus, in particular, it bears the quotient topology of the set

$$X_0 \sqcup \bigsqcup_{e \in E} I_e$$

under the quotient map used for gluing. Here $X_0$ is the 0-skeleton (consisting of one point for each vertex $x \in V$), $I_e$ are the closed intervals glued to it, one for each edge $e \in E$, and $\sqcup$ is the disjoint union.

The topology on this space is called the graph topology.

== Subgraphs and trees ==
A subgraph of a graph $X$ is a subspace $Y \subseteq X$ which is also a graph and whose nodes are all contained in the 0-skeleton of $X$. $Y$ is a subgraph if and only if it consists of vertices and edges from $X$ and is closed.

A subgraph $T \subseteq X$ is called a tree if it is contractible as a topological space. This can be shown equivalent to the usual definition of a tree in graph theory, namely a connected graph without cycles.

== Properties ==
- The associated topological space of a graph is connected (with respect to the graph topology) if and only if the original graph is connected.
- Every connected graph $X$ contains at least one maximal tree $T \subseteq X$, that is, a tree that is maximal with respect to the order induced by set inclusion on the subgraphs of $X$ which are trees.
- If $X$ is a graph and $T \subseteq X$ a maximal tree, then the fundamental group $\pi_1(X)$ equals the free group generated by elements $(f_\alpha)_{\alpha \in A}$, where the $\{f_\alpha\}$ correspond bijectively to the edges of $X \setminus T$; in fact, $X\setminus T$ is homotopy equivalent to a wedge sum of circles.
- Forming the topological space associated to a graph as above amounts to a functor from the category of graphs to the category of topological spaces.
- Every covering space projecting to a graph is also a graph.

== See also ==
- Graph homology
- Topological graph theory
- Nielsen–Schreier theorem, whose standard proof makes use of this concept.
