= Singular homology =

Concept in algebraic topology

In algebraic topology, singular homology refers to the study of a certain set of algebraic invariants of a topological space $X$, the so-called homology groups $H_n(X).$ Intuitively, singular homology counts, for each dimension $n$, the $n$-dimensional holes of a space. Singular homology is a particular example of a homology theory, which has now grown to be a rather broad collection of theories. Of the various theories, it is perhaps one of the simpler ones to understand, being built on fairly concrete constructions (see also the related theory simplicial homology).

In brief, singular homology is constructed by taking maps of the standard n-simplex to a topological space, and composing them into formal sums, called singular chains. The boundary operation – mapping each $n$-dimensional simplex to its $(n-1)$-dimensional boundary – induces the singular chain complex. The singular homology is then the homology of the chain complex. The resulting homology groups are the same for all homotopy equivalent spaces, which is the reason for their study. These constructions can be applied to all topological spaces, and so singular homology is expressible as a functor from the category of topological spaces to the category of graded abelian groups.

== Singular simplices ==
The standard 2-simplex Δ^{2} in R^{3}

A singular n-simplex in a topological space $X$ is a continuous function (also called a map) $\sigma$ from the standard $n$-simplex $\Delta^n$ to $X$, written $\sigma:\Delta^n\to X.$ This map need not be injective, and there can be non-equivalent singular simplices with the same image in $X$.

The boundary of $\sigma,$ denoted as $\partial_n\sigma,$ is defined to be the formal sum of the singular $(n-1)$-simplices represented by the restriction of $\sigma$ to the faces of the standard $n$-simplex, with an alternating sign to take orientation into account. (A formal sum is an element of the free abelian group on the simplices. The basis for the group is the infinite set of all possible singular simplices. The group operation is "addition" and the sum of simplex $a$ with simplex $b$ is usually simply designated $a+b$, but $a+a=2a$ and so on. Every simplex $a$ has a negative $-a$.) Thus, if we designate $\sigma$ by its vertices

$$[p_0,p_1,\ldots,p_n]=[\sigma(e_0),\sigma(e_1),\ldots,\sigma(e_n)]$$

corresponding to the vertices $e_k$ of the standard $n$-simplex $\Delta^n$ (which of course does not fully specify the singular simplex produced by $\sigma$), then

$$\begin{aligned}\partial_n\sigma&=\partial_n[p_0,p_1,\ldots,p_n]=\sum_{k=0}^n(-1)^k [p_0,\ldots,p_{k-1},p_{k+1},\ldots ,p_n]\\ &= \sum_{k=0}^n (-1)^k \sigma\mid _{[e_0,\ldots,e_{k-1},e_{k+1},\ldots ,e_n]}\end{aligned}$$

is a formal sum of the faces of the simplex image designated in a specific way. (That is, a particular face has to be the restriction of $\sigma$ to a face of $\Delta^n$ which depends on the order that its vertices are listed.) Thus, for example, the boundary of $\sigma=[p_0,p_1]$ (a curve going from $p_0$ to $p_1$) is the formal sum (or "formal difference") $[p_1] - [p_0]$.

== Singular chain complex ==
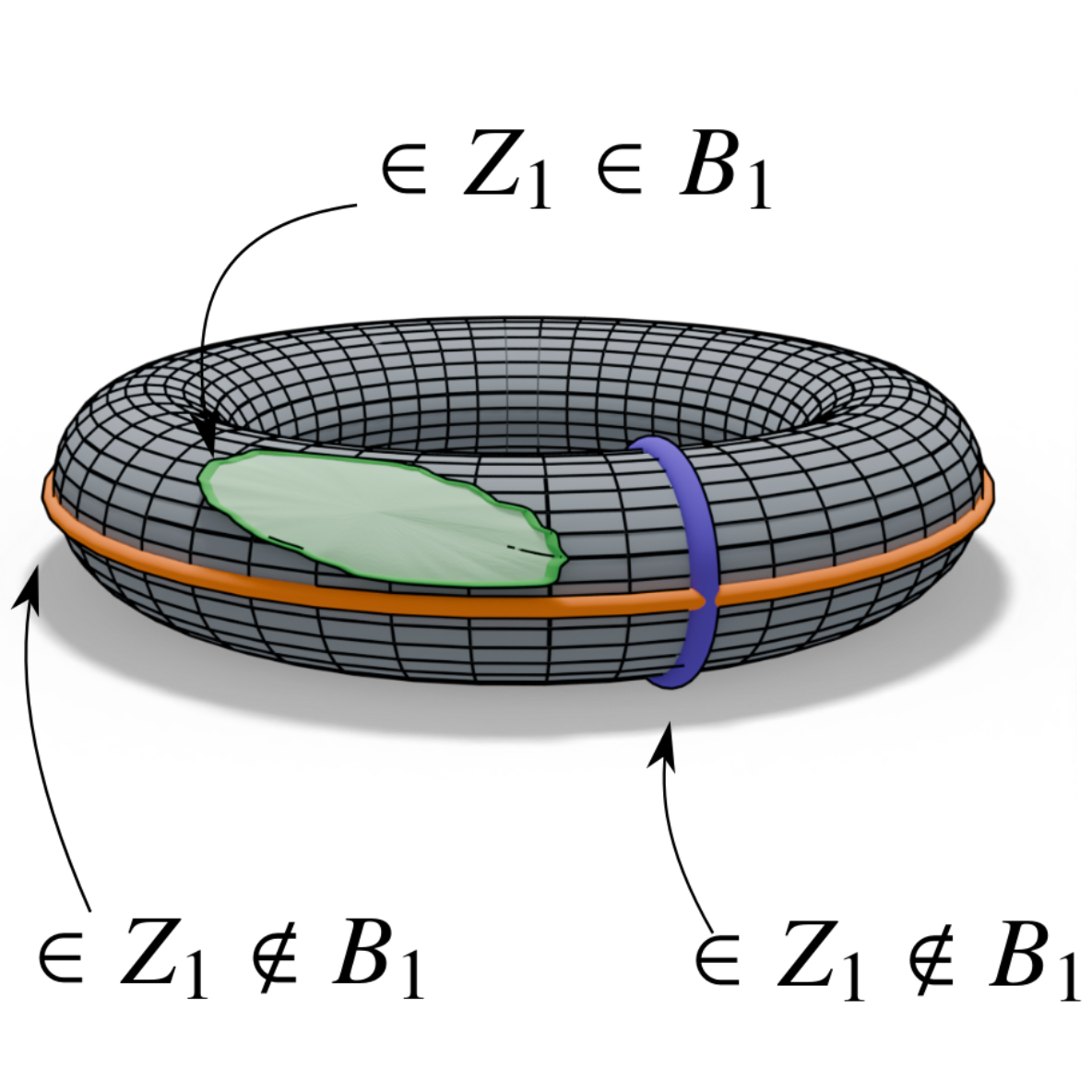
Example of singular 1-chains: The blue and orange 1-chains cannot be realized as a boundary of a 2-chain

The usual construction of singular homology proceeds by defining formal sums of simplices, which may be understood to be elements of a free abelian group, and then showing that we can define a certain group, the homology group of the topological space, involving the boundary operator.

Consider first the set of all possible singular $n$-simplices $\sigma_n(X)$ on a topological space $X$. This set may be used as the basis of a free abelian group, so that each singular $n$-simplex is a generator of the group. This set of generators is of course usually infinite, frequently uncountable, as there are many ways of mapping a simplex into a typical topological space. The free abelian group generated by this basis is commonly denoted as $C_n(X)$. Elements of $C_n(X)$ are called singular n-chains; they are formal sums of singular simplices with integer coefficients.

The boundary $\partial$ is readily extended to act on singular $n$-chains. The extension, called the boundary operator, written as

$$\partial_n:C_n\to C_{n-1},$$

is a homomorphism of groups. The boundary operator, together with the $C_n$, form a chain complex of abelian groups, called the singular complex. It is often denoted as $(C_\bullet(X),\partial_\bullet)$ or more simply $C_\bullet(X)$.

The kernel of the boundary operator is $Z_n(X)=\ker (\partial_{n})$, and is called the group of singular n-cycles. The image of the boundary operator is $B_n(X)=\operatorname{im} (\partial_{n+1})$, and is called the group of singular n-boundaries.

It can also be shown that $\partial_n\circ \partial_{n+1}=0$, implying $B_n(X) \subseteq Z_n(X)$. The $n$-th homology group of $X$ is then defined as the factor group

$$H_{n}(X) = Z_n(X) / B_n(X).$$

The elements of $H_n(X)$ are called homology classes.

== Homotopy invariance ==
If X and Y are two topological spaces with the same homotopy type (i.e. are homotopy equivalent), then

$$H_n(X) \cong H_n(Y)\,$$

for all n ≥ 0. This means homology groups are homotopy invariants, and therefore topological invariants.

In particular, if X is a connected contractible space, then all its homology groups are 0, except $H_0(X) \cong \mathbb{Z}$. More generally, $H_0(X)$ counts path components.

A proof for the homotopy invariance of singular homology groups can be sketched as follows. A continuous map f: X → Y induces a homomorphism

$$f_{\sharp} : C_n(X) \rightarrow C_n(Y).$$

It can be verified immediately that

$$\partial f_{\sharp} = f_{\sharp} \partial,$$

i.e. f_{#} is a chain map, which descends to homomorphisms on homology

$$f_* : H_n(X) \rightarrow H_n(Y).$$

We now show that if f and g are homotopically equivalent, then f_{*} = g_{*}. From this follows that if f is a homotopy equivalence, then f_{*} is an isomorphism.

Let F : X × [0, 1] → Y be a homotopy that takes f to g. On the level of chains, define a homomorphism

$$P : C_n(X) \rightarrow C_{n+1}(Y)$$

that, geometrically speaking, takes a basis element σ: Δ^{n} → X of C_{n}(X) to the "prism" P(σ): Δ^{n} × I → Y. The boundary of P(σ) can be expressed as

$$\partial P(\sigma) = f_{\sharp}(\sigma) - g_{\sharp}(\sigma) - P(\partial \sigma).$$

So if α in C_{n}(X) is an n-cycle, then f_{#}(α) and g_{#}(α) differ by a boundary:

$$f_{\sharp} (\alpha) - g_{\sharp}(\alpha) = \partial P(\alpha),$$

i.e. they are homologous. This proves the claim.

The relationship $\partial P + P \partial = f_{\sharp} - g_{\sharp}$ observed above can be expressed by saying P is a chain homotopy between f_{#} and g_{#}, or that f_{#} and g_{#} are chain homotopic. From the above proof outline, we can conclude that chain homotopic maps induce the same homomorphism on homology.

== Homology groups of common spaces ==
The table below shows the k-th homology groups $H_k(X)$ of n-dimensional real projective spaces RP^{n}, complex projective spaces, CP^{n}, a point, spheres S^{n}($n\ge 1$), and a 3-torus T^{3} with integer coefficients.

| Space | Homotopy type | |
|---|---|---|
| RP^{n} | $\mathbf{Z}$ | k = 0 and k = n odd |
| RP^{n} | $\mathbf{Z}/2\mathbf{Z}$ | k odd, 0 < k < n |
| RP^{n} | 0 | otherwise |
| CP^{n} | $\mathbf{Z}$ | k = 0,2,4,...,2n |
| CP^{n} | 0 | otherwise |
| point | $\mathbf{Z}$ | k = 0 |
| point | 0 | otherwise |
| S^{n} | $\mathbf{Z}$ | k = 0,n |
| S^{n} | 0 | otherwise |
| T^{3} | $\mathbf{Z}$ | k = 0,3 |
| T^{3} | $\mathbf{Z}$^{3} | k = 1,2 |
| T^{3} | 0 | otherwise |
| Genus $g$ surface | $\mathbf{Z}$ | k = 0,2 |
| Genus $g$ surface | $\mathbf{Z}$^{2g} | k = 1 |
| Genus $g$ surface | 0 | otherwise |

As an example of how to compute homology of a space, we compute the homology of a point $\star$. For all $n$, since all maps from an $n$-simplex to a point are trivial, $C_n(\star) = \mathbf{Z}$. We compute $\partial_n$: for an $n$-chain $\sigma = [v_0, \ldots, v_n]$,

$$\partial_n(\sigma) = \sum \limits_{i = 0}^n (-1)^i [v_0, \ldots, \hat{v}_i, \ldots, v_n],$$

where the hat denotes the omission of the vertex. Then $\partial_n(\sigma)$ simplifies to 0 if $n$ is odd and $\sigma_{n-1}$ if $n$ is even where $\sigma_{n-1}$ is a $(n-1)$-chain. That is,

$$\partial_n = \begin{cases} 0 & \mathrm{if}\ n = 0, n = 2k-1, k \in \{1,2,3,\ldots\}; \\ \mathrm{id} & \mathrm{otherwise}.\end{cases}$$

The kernel and image of the identity are 0 and the target, respectively, and the kernel and image of the 0 map are the source and the image, respectively. Thus we have the result in the table above, with the following justifications. When $n$ is odd, the kernel of the $n$-boundary map and the image of the $(n+1)$-boundary map are equal. When $n$ is even and positive, the kernel of the $n$-boundary map is 0. For $n=0$, the kernel of the $0$-boundary map is $\mathbf{Z}$, and the image of the $1$-boundary is 0.

== Functoriality ==
The construction above can be defined for any topological space, and is preserved by the action of continuous maps. This generality implies that singular homology theory can be recast in the language of category theory. In particular, the homology group can be understood to be a functor from the category of topological spaces Top to the category of abelian groups Ab.

Consider first that $X\mapsto C_n(X)$ is a map from topological spaces to free abelian groups. This suggests that $C_n(X)$ might be taken to be a functor, provided one can understand its action on the morphisms of Top. Now, the morphisms of Top are continuous functions, so if $f:X\to Y$ is a continuous map of topological spaces, it can be extended to a homomorphism of groups

$$f_*:C_n(X)\to C_n(Y)\,$$

by defining

$$f_*\left(\sum_i a_i\sigma_i\right)=\sum_i a_i (f\circ \sigma_i)$$

where $\sigma_i:\Delta^n\to X$ is a singular simplex, and $\sum_i a_i\sigma_i\,$ is a singular n-chain, that is, an element of $C_n(X)$. This shows that $C_n$ is a functor

$$C_n:\mathbf{Top} \to \mathbf{Ab}$$

from the category of topological spaces to the category of abelian groups.

The boundary operator commutes with continuous maps, so that $\partial_n f_*=f_*\partial_n$. This allows the entire chain complex to be treated as a functor. In particular, this shows that the map $X\mapsto H_n (X)$ is a functor

$$H_n:\mathbf{Top}\to\mathbf{Ab}$$

from the category of topological spaces to the category of abelian groups. By the homotopy axiom, one has that $H_n$ is also a functor, called the homology functor, acting on hTop, the quotient homotopy category:

$$H_n:\mathbf{hTop}\to\mathbf{Ab}.$$

This distinguishes singular homology from other homology theories, wherein $H_n$ is still a functor, but is not necessarily defined on all of Top. In some sense, singular homology is the "largest" homology theory, in that every homology theory on a subcategory of Top agrees with singular homology on that subcategory. On the other hand, the singular homology does not have the cleanest categorical properties; such a cleanup motivates the development of other homology theories such as cellular homology.

More generally, the homology functor is defined axiomatically, as a functor on an abelian category, or, alternately, as a functor on chain complexes, satisfying axioms that require a boundary morphism that turns short exact sequences into long exact sequences. In the case of singular homology, the homology functor may be factored into two pieces, a topological piece and an algebraic piece. The topological piece is given by

$$C_\bullet:\mathbf{Top}\to\mathbf{Comp}$$

which maps topological spaces as $X\mapsto (C_\bullet(X),\partial_\bullet)$ and continuous functions as $f\mapsto f_*$. Here, then, $C_\bullet$ is understood to be the singular chain functor, which maps topological spaces to the category of chain complexes Comp (or Kom). The category of chain complexes has chain complexes as its objects, and chain maps as its morphisms.

The second, algebraic part is the homology functor

$$H_n:\mathbf{Comp}\to\mathbf{Ab}$$

which maps

$$C_\bullet\mapsto H_n(C_\bullet)=Z_n(C_\bullet)/B_n(C_\bullet)$$

and takes chain maps to maps of abelian groups. It is this homology functor that may be defined axiomatically, so that it stands on its own as a functor on the category of chain complexes.

Homotopy maps re-enter the picture by defining homotopically equivalent chain maps. Thus, one may define the quotient category hComp or K, the homotopy category of chain complexes.

== Coefficients in R ==
Given any unital ring R, the set of singular n-simplices on a topological space can be taken to be the generators of a free R-module. That is, rather than performing the above constructions from the starting point of free abelian groups, one instead uses free R-modules in their place. All of the constructions go through with little or no change. The result of this is

$$H_n(X; R)\$$

which is now an R-module. Of course, it is usually not a free module. The usual homology group is regained by noting that

$$H_n(X;\mathbb{Z})=H_n(X)$$

when one takes the ring to be the ring of integers. The notation H_{n}(X; R) should not be confused with the nearly identical notation H_{n}(X, A), which denotes the relative homology (below).

The universal coefficient theorem provides a mechanism to calculate the homology with R coefficients in terms of homology with usual integer coefficients using the short exact sequence

$$0\to H_n(X; \mathbb{Z}) \otimes R \to H_n(X; R) \to \mathrm{Tor}_1(H_{n-1}(X; \mathbb{Z}), R) \to 0.$$

where Tor is the Tor functor. This sequence splits, though not naturally, providing a description of $H_n(X; R)$ in terms of its integer homology. Of note, if R is torsion-free, then $\mathrm{Tor}_1(G, R) = 0$ for any G, so the above short exact sequence reduces to an isomorphism between $H_n(X; \mathbb{Z}) \otimes R$ and $H_n(X; R).$

== Relative homology ==
For a subspace $A\subset X$, the relative homology H_{n}(X, A) is understood to be the homology of the quotient of the chain complexes, that is,

$$H_n(X,A)=H_n(C_\bullet(X)/C_\bullet(A))$$

where the quotient of chain complexes is given by the short exact sequence

$0\to C_\bullet(A) \to C_\bullet(X) \to C_\bullet(X)/C_\bullet(A) \to 0.$

== Reduced homology ==
The reduced homology of a space X, annotated as $\tilde{H}_n(X)$ is a minor modification to the usual homology which simplifies expressions of some relationships and fulfils the intuition that all homology groups of a point should be zero.

For the usual homology defined on a chain complex:

$$\dotsb\overset{\partial_{n+1}}{\longrightarrow\,}C_n
\overset{\partial_n}{\longrightarrow\,}C_{n-1}
\overset{\partial_{n-1}}{\longrightarrow\,}
\dotsb
\overset{\partial_2}{\longrightarrow\,}
C_1
\overset{\partial_1}{\longrightarrow\,}
C_0\overset{\partial_0}{\longrightarrow\,} 0$$

To define the reduced homology, we augment the chain complex with an additional $\mathbb{Z}$ between $C_0$ and zero:

$\dotsb\overset{\partial_{n+1}}{\longrightarrow\,}C_n \overset{\partial_n}{\longrightarrow\,}C_{n-1} \overset{\partial_{n-1}}{\longrightarrow\,} \dotsb \overset{\partial_2}{\longrightarrow\,} C_1 \overset{\partial_1}{\longrightarrow\,} C_0\overset{\epsilon}{\longrightarrow\,} \mathbb{Z} \to 0$

where $\epsilon \left( \sum_i n_i \sigma_i \right) = \sum_i n_i$. This can be justified by interpreting the empty set as the "(−1)-simplex", which means that $C_{-1} \cong \Z.$

The reduced homology groups are now defined by $\tilde{H}_n(X) = \ker(\partial_n) / \mathrm{im}(\partial_{n+1})$ for positive n and $\tilde{H}_0(X) = \ker(\epsilon) / \mathrm{im}(\partial_1)$.

For n > 0, $H_n(X) = \tilde{H}_n(X)$, while for n = 0, $H_0(X) = \tilde{H}_0(X) \oplus \mathbb{Z}.$

== Cohomology ==
By dualizing the homology chain complex (i.e. applying the functor Hom(-, R), R being any ring) we obtain a cochain complex with coboundary map $\delta$. The cohomology groups of X are defined as the homology groups of this complex; in a quip, "cohomology is the homology of the co [the dual complex]".

The cohomology groups have a richer, or at least more familiar, algebraic structure than the homology groups. Firstly, they form a differential graded algebra as follows:

- the graded set of groups form a graded R-module;
- this can be given the structure of a graded R-algebra using the cup product;
- the Bockstein homomorphism β gives a differential.

There are additional cohomology operations, and the cohomology algebra has addition structure mod p (as before, the mod p cohomology is the cohomology of the mod p cochain complex, not the mod p reduction of the cohomology), notably the Steenrod algebra structure.

== Betti homology and cohomology ==
Since the number of homology theories has become large (see Category:Homology theory), the terms Betti homology and Betti cohomology are sometimes applied (particularly by authors writing on algebraic geometry) to the singular theory, as giving rise to the Betti numbers of the most familiar spaces such as simplicial complexes and closed manifolds.

== Extraordinary homology ==
If one defines a homology theory axiomatically (via the Eilenberg–Steenrod axioms), and then relaxes one of the axioms (the dimension axiom), one obtains a generalized theory, called an extraordinary homology theory. These originally arose in the form of extraordinary cohomology theories, namely K-theory and cobordism theory. In this context, singular homology is referred to as ordinary homology.

== See also ==
- Derived category
- Excision theorem
- Hurewicz theorem
- Simplicial homology
- Cellular homology
