= Leopold Vietoris =

Austrian topologist

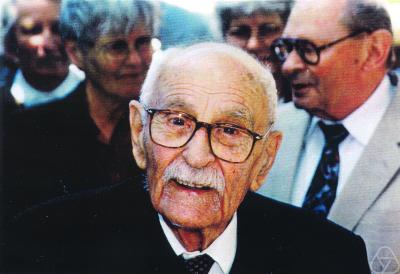
- Vietoris on his 110th birthday in 2001
- Born: 4 June 1891; Bad Radkersburg, Styria, Austria-Hungary
- Died: 9 April 2002 (aged 110 years, 309 days); Innsbruck, Tyrol, Austria
- Education: TU Wien; University of Vienna
- Known for: Contributions to topology Being a supercentenarian
- Spouse(s): Klara Riccabona (m. 1928; died 1935) Maria Josefa Vincentia von Riccabona zu Reichenfels (m. 1936; died 2002)
- Children: 6
- Scientific career
- Fields: Mathematics
- Workplaces: University of Innsbruck
- Doctoral advisors: Gustav Ritter von Escherich; Wilhelm Wirtinger

Leopold Vietoris (/viːˈtɔːrɪs/ vee-TOR-iss; German: [ˈleːopɔlt viːˈtoːʁɪs], Austrian German: [ˈleːopɔld viːˈtoːrɪs]; 4 June 1891 – 9 April 2002) was an Austrian mathematician, World War I veteran and supercentenarian. He was born in Radkersburg and died in Innsbruck.

He was known for his contributions to topology—notably the Mayer–Vietoris sequence—and other fields of mathematics, his interest in mathematical history, and for being a keen alpinist.

== Biography ==
Vietoris studied mathematics and geometry at the Vienna University of Technology. He was drafted in 1914 in World War I and was wounded in September that same year. On 4 November 1918, one week before the Armistice of Villa Giusti, he became an Italian prisoner of war. After returning to Austria, he attended the University of Vienna, where he earned his PhD in 1920, with a thesis written under the supervision of Gustav von Escherich and Wilhelm Wirtinger.

In autumn 1928 he married his first wife Klara Riccabona, who later died while giving birth to their sixth daughter. In 1936 he married Klara's sister, Maria Riccabona.

Vietoris was survived by his six daughters, 17 grandchildren, and 30 great-grandchildren.

He lends his name to a few mathematical concepts:

- Vietoris topology
- Vietoris homology (see homology theory)
- Mayer–Vietoris sequence
- Vietoris–Begle mapping theorem
- Vietoris–Rips complex

Vietoris remained scientifically active in his later years, even writing one paper on trigonometric sums at the age of 103.

Vietoris lived to be 110 years and 309 days old, and became the oldest verified Austrian man ever.

== Decorations and awards ==
- Austrian Decoration for Science and Art (1973)
- Grand Gold Decoration for Services to the Republic of Austria (1981)
- Honorary member of the German Mathematical Society (1992)

== Sources ==
- Weibel, Peter, ed. (2005). Beyond Art: A Third Culture: A Comparative Study in Cultures, Art and Science in 20th Century Austria and Hungary. Springer Science & Business Media. p. 260. ISBN 978-3-211-24562-0.
