= Zig-zag lemma =

On a particular long exact sequence in the homology groups of certain chain complexes

In mathematics, particularly homological algebra, the zig-zag lemma asserts the existence of a particular long exact sequence in the homology groups of certain chain complexes. The result is valid in every abelian category. It can be regarded as a generalization of the Mayer–Vietoris sequence.

== Statement ==
In an abelian category (such as the category of abelian groups or the category of vector spaces over a given field), let $(\mathcal{A},\partial_{\bullet}), (\mathcal{B},\partial_{\bullet}')$ and $(\mathcal{C},\partial_{\bullet}'')$ be chain complexes that fit into the following short exact sequence:

$$0 \longrightarrow \mathcal{A} \mathrel{\stackrel{\alpha}{\longrightarrow}} \mathcal{B} \mathrel{\stackrel{\beta}{\longrightarrow}} \mathcal{C}\longrightarrow 0$$

Such a sequence is shorthand for the following commutative diagram:

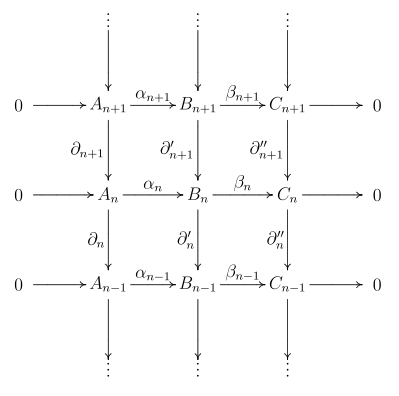

where the rows are exact sequences and each column is a chain complex.

The zig-zag lemma asserts that there is a collection of boundary maps

$$\delta_n : H_n(\mathcal{C}) \longrightarrow H_{n-1}(\mathcal{A}),$$

that makes the following sequence exact:

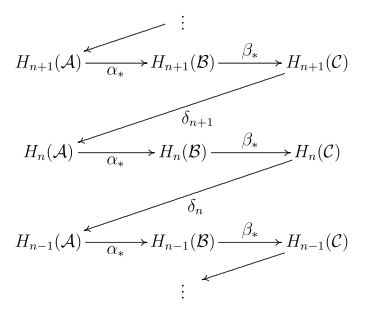

The maps $\alpha_*^{ }$ and $\beta_*^{ }$ are the usual maps induced by homology. The boundary maps $\delta_n^{ }$ are explained below. The name of the lemma arises from the "zig-zag" behavior of the maps in the sequence. A variant version of the zig-zag lemma is commonly known as the "snake lemma" (it extracts the essence of the proof of the zig-zag lemma given below).

== Construction of the boundary maps ==
The maps $\delta_n^{ }$ are defined using a standard diagram chasing argument. Let $c \in C_n$ represent a class in $H_n(\mathcal{C})$, so $\partial_n''(c) = 0$. Exactness of the row implies that $\beta_n^{ }$ is surjective, so there must be some $b \in B_n$ with $\beta_n^{ }(b) = c$. By commutativity of the diagram,

$$\beta_{n-1} \partial_n' (b) = \partial_n'' \beta_n(b) = \partial_n''(c) = 0.$$

By exactness,

$$\partial_n'(b) \in \ker \beta_{n-1} = \mathrm{im}\; \alpha_{n-1}.$$

Thus, since $\alpha_{n-1}^{}$ is injective, there is a unique element $a \in A_{n-1}$ such that $\alpha_{n-1}(a) = \partial_n'(b)$. This is a cycle, since $\alpha_{n-2}^{ }$ is injective and

$$\alpha_{n-2} \partial_{n-1}(a) = \partial_{n-1}' \alpha_{n-1}(a) = \partial_{n-1}' \partial_n'(b) = 0,$$

since $\partial^2 = 0$. That is, $\partial_{n-1}(a) \in \ker \alpha_{n-2} = \{0\}$. This means $a$ is a cycle, so it represents a class in $H_{n-1}(\mathcal{A})$. We can now define

$$\delta_{ }^{ }[c] = [a].$$

With the boundary maps defined, one can show that they are well-defined (that is, independent of the choices of c and b). The proof uses diagram chasing arguments similar to that above. Such arguments are also used to show that the sequence in homology is exact at each group.

== See also ==
- Mayer–Vietoris sequence
