= Formal sum =

In mathematics, a formal sum, formal series, or formal linear combination may be:

- In group theory, an element of a free abelian group, a sum of finitely many elements from a given basis set multiplied by integer coefficients.
- In linear algebra, an element of a vector space, a sum of finitely many elements from a given basis set multiplied by real, complex, or other numerical coefficients.
- In the study of series (mathematics), a sum of an infinite sequence of numbers or other quantities, considered as an abstract mathematical object regardless of whether the sum converges.
- In the study of power series, a sum of infinitely many monomials with distinct positive integer exponents, again considered as an abstract object regardless of convergence (see formal power series).
