= Reduced homology =

Mathematical theory

In mathematics, reduced homology is a minor modification made to homology theory in algebraic topology, motivated by the intuition that all of the homology groups of a single point should be equal to zero. This modification allows more concise statements to be made (as in Alexander duality) and eliminates many exceptional cases (as in the homology groups of spheres).

If P is a single-point space, then with the usual definitions the integral homology group

H_{0}(P)

is isomorphic to $\mathbb{Z}$ (an infinite cyclic group), while for i ≥ 1 we have

H_{i}(P) = {0}.

More generally if X is a simplicial complex or finite CW complex, then the group H_{0}(X) is the free abelian group with the connected components of X as generators. The reduced homology should replace this group, of rank r say, by one of rank r − 1. Otherwise the homology groups should remain unchanged. An ad hoc way to do this is to think of a 0-th homology class not as a formal sum of connected components, but as such a formal sum where the coefficients add up to zero.

In the usual definition of homology of a space X, we consider the chain complex

$$\dotsb\overset{\partial_{n+1}}{\longrightarrow\,}C_n
\overset{\partial_n}{\longrightarrow\,}C_{n-1}
\overset{\partial_{n-1}}{\longrightarrow\,}
\dotsb
\overset{\partial_2}{\longrightarrow\,}
C_1
\overset{\partial_1}{\longrightarrow\,}
C_0\overset{\partial_0}{\longrightarrow\,} 0$$

and define the homology groups by $H_n(X) = \ker(\partial_n) / \mathrm{im}(\partial_{n+1})$.

To define reduced homology, we start with the augmented chain complex

$\dotsb\overset{\partial_{n+1}}{\longrightarrow\,}C_n \overset{\partial_n}{\longrightarrow\,}C_{n-1} \overset{\partial_{n-1}}{\longrightarrow\,} \dotsb \overset{\partial_2}{\longrightarrow\,} C_1 \overset{\partial_1}{\longrightarrow\,} C_0\overset{\epsilon}{\longrightarrow\,} \mathbb{Z} \to 0$

where $\epsilon \left( \sum_i n_i \sigma_i \right) = \sum_i n_i$. Now we define the reduced homology groups by

$\tilde{H}_n(X) = \ker(\partial_n) / \mathrm{im}(\partial_{n+1})$ for positive n and $\tilde{H}_0(X) = \ker(\epsilon) / \mathrm{im}(\partial_1)$.

One can show that $H_0(X) = \tilde{H}_0(X) \oplus \mathbb{Z}$; evidently $H_n(X) = \tilde{H}_n(X)$ for all positive n.

Armed with this modified complex, the standard ways to obtain homology with coefficients by applying the tensor product, or reduced cohomology groups from the cochain complex made by using a Hom functor, can be applied.
