= Riemann–Hurwitz formula =

Mathematical formula of two surfaces

In mathematics, the Riemann–Hurwitz formula, named after Bernhard Riemann and Adolf Hurwitz, describes the relationship of the Euler characteristics of two surfaces when one is a ramified covering of the other. It therefore connects ramification with algebraic topology, in this case. It is a prototype result for many others, and is often applied in the theory of Riemann surfaces (which is its origin) and algebraic curves.

== Statement ==
For a compact, connected, orientable surface $S$, the Euler characteristic $\chi(S)$ is

$$\chi(S)=2-2g$$,

where g is the genus (the number of handles). This follows, as the Betti numbers are $1, 2g, 1, 0, 0, \dots$.

For the case of an (unramified) covering map of surfaces

$$\pi\colon S' \to S$$

that is surjective and of degree $N$, we have the formula

$$\chi(S') = N\cdot\chi(S).$$

That is because each simplex of $S$ should be covered by exactly $N$ in $S'$, at least if we use a fine enough triangulation of $S$, as we are entitled to do since the Euler characteristic is a topological invariant. What the Riemann–Hurwitz formula does is to add in a correction to allow for ramification (sheets coming together).

Now assume that $S$ and $S'$ are Riemann surfaces, and that the map $\pi$ is complex analytic. The map $\pi$ is said to be ramified at a point $P'$ in $S'$ if there are analytic coordinates in open neighboorhoods $U'$ of $P'$ and $U = \pi(U')$ near $P = \pi(P')$ such that $\pi$ takes the form $\pi(z)=z^n$ with $n>1$. Equivalently, the point $P$ has exactly one nearby preimage $\pi^{-1}(P)\cap U'=\{P'\}$, but any other point $Q$ in U has exactly n nearby preimages $\pi^{-1}(Q)\cap U'= \{Q'_1,\ldots,Q'_n\}$. The number n is called the ramification index at $P'$ and is denoted by $e_{P'}$. In calculating the Euler characteristic of $S'$ we notice the loss of $e_{P'}-1$ copies of $P'$ above $P$. Now compute the Euler characteristics using triangulations of $S$ and $S'$with vertices at the respective branch and ramification points. The triangulation of $S'$will have the same number of positive-dimensional faces as in the unramified case, but fewer than expected vertices. The correct formula accounting for ramifications is the Riemann–Hurwitz formula or Hurwitz's theorem:

$$\chi(S') = N\cdot\chi(S) - \sum_{P\in S'} (e_P -1),$$

or equivalently, using $\chi(X) = 2 - 2g(X)$ and multiplying by −1:

$$2g(S')-2 = N\cdot(2g(S)-2) +\sum_{P\in S'} (e_P -1).$$

Only finitely many P have $e_{P'}>1$, so the sum has only finitely many non-zero terms.

Another useful form of the formula is:

$$\chi(S')- b' = N \cdot (\chi(S) - b),$$

where b is the number of branch points in S (images of ramification points) and b' is the size of the union of the fibers of branch points (this contains all ramification points and perhaps some non-ramified points). Indeed, to obtain this formula, remove disjoint disc neighborhoods of the branch points from S and their preimages in S' so that the restriction of $\pi$ is a covering. Removing a disc from a surface lowers its Euler characteristic by 1 by the formula for connected sum, so we finish by the formula for a non-ramified covering.

We can also see that this formula is equivalent to the usual form, as we have

$$N \cdot b - b' = \sum_{P\in S'} (e_P - 1),$$

since for any $Q \in S$ we have $\textstyle N = \sum_{Q' \in \pi^{-1}(Q)} e_{Q'}$.

The above Euler-characteristic formulas are also valid for non-orientable surfaces such as the real projective plane.

== Examples ==
The Weierstrass $\wp$-function, considered as a meromorphic function with values in the Riemann sphere, yields a map from an elliptic curve (genus 1) to the projective line (genus 0). It is a double cover (N = 2), with ramification at four points only, at which e = 2. The Riemann–Hurwitz formula then reads

$$0 = 2\cdot2 - 4\cdot(2 - 1)$$

with the summation taken over four ramification points.

The formula may also be used to calculate the genus of hyperelliptic curves.

As another example, the Riemann sphere maps to itself by the function z^{n}, which has ramification index n at 0, for any integer n > 1. There can only be other ramification at the point at infinity. In order to balance the equation

$$2 = n\cdot2 - (n - 1) - (e_\infty - 1)$$

we must have ramification index n at infinity, also.

== Consequences ==
Several results in algebraic topology and complex analysis follow.

Firstly, there are no ramified covering maps from a curve of lower genus to a curve of higher genus – and thus, since non-constant meromorphic maps of curves are ramified covering spaces, there are no non-constant meromorphic maps from a curve of lower genus to a curve of higher genus.

As another example, it shows immediately that a curve of genus 0 has no cover with N > 1 that is unramified everywhere: because that would give rise to an Euler characteristic > 2.

== Generalizations ==
For a correspondence of curves, there is a more general formula, Zeuthen's theorem, which gives the ramification correction to the first approximation that the Euler characteristics are in the inverse ratio to the degrees of the correspondence.

An orbifold covering of degree N between orbifold surfaces S' and S is a branched covering, so the Riemann–Hurwitz formula implies the usual formula for coverings

$$\chi(S') = N\cdot\chi(S) \,$$

denoting with $\chi \,$ the orbifold Euler characteristic.
