= Shelling (topology) =

Mathematical concept

In mathematics, a shelling of a simplicial complex is a way of gluing it together from its maximal simplices (simplices that are not a face of another simplex) in a well-behaved way. A complex admitting a shelling is called shellable.

== Definition ==
A d-dimensional simplicial complex is called pure if its maximal simplices all have dimension d. Let $\Delta$ be a finite or countably infinite simplicial complex. An ordering $C_1,C_2,\ldots$ of the maximal simplices of $\Delta$ is a shelling if, for all $k=2,3,\ldots$, the complex

$$B_k:=\Big(\bigcup_{i=1}^{k-1}C_i\Big)\cap C_k$$

is pure and of dimension one smaller than $\dim C_k$. That is, the "new" simplex $C_k$ meets the previous simplices along some union $B_k$ of top-dimensional simplices of the boundary of $C_k$. If $B_k$ is the entire boundary of $C_k$ then $C_k$ is called spanning.

For $\Delta$ not necessarily countable, one can define a shelling as a well-ordering of the maximal simplices of $\Delta$ having the analogous properties.

== Properties ==
- A shellable complex is homotopy equivalent to a wedge sum of spheres, one for each spanning simplex of corresponding dimension.
- A shellable complex may admit many different shellings, but the number of spanning simplices and their dimensions do not depend on the choice of shelling. This follows from the previous property.

== Examples ==
- Every Coxeter complex, and more generally every building (in the sense of Tits), is shellable.
- The boundary complex of a (convex) polytope is shellable. Note that here, shellability is generalized to the case of polyhedral complexes (that are not necessarily simplicial).
- There is an unshellable triangulation of the tetrahedron.
