= Buekenhout =

Buekenhout may refer to:

- Francis Buekenhout, a Belgian mathematician;
- Buekenhout geometry, or Buekenhout–Tits geometry, a generalization of projective spaces, Tits buildings, and several other geometric structures, introduced in 1979 by Francis Buekenhout.
