= Weyl distance function =

In combinatorial geometry, the Weyl distance function is a function that behaves in some ways like the distance function of a metric space, but instead of taking values in the positive real numbers, it takes values in a group of reflections, called the Weyl group (named for Hermann Weyl). This distance function is defined on the collection of chambers in a mathematical structure known as a building, and its value on a pair of chambers a minimal sequence of reflections (in the Weyl group) to go from one chamber to the other. An adjacent sequence of chambers in a building is known as a gallery, so the Weyl distance function is a way of encoding the information of a minimal gallery between two chambers. In particular, the number of reflections to go from one chamber to another coincides with the length of the minimal gallery between the two chambers, and so gives a natural metric (the gallery metric) on the building. According to Abramenko & Brown (2008), the Weyl distance function is something like a geometric vector: it encodes both the magnitude (distance) between two chambers of a building, as well as the direction between them.

== Definitions ==
We record here definitions from Abramenko & Brown (2008). Let Σ(W,S) be the Coxeter complex associated to a group W generated by a set of reflections S. The vertices of Σ(W,S) are the elements of W, and the chambers of the complex are the cosets of S in W. The vertices of each chamber can be colored in a one-to-one manner by the elements of S so that no adjacent vertices of the complex receive the same color. This coloring, although essentially canonical, is not quite unique. The coloring of a given chamber is not uniquely determined by its realization as a coset of S. But once the coloring of a single chamber has been fixed, the rest of the Coxeter complex is uniquely colorable. Fix such a coloring of the complex.

A gallery is a sequence of adjacent chambers

$$C_0,C_1,\dots,C_n.$$

Because these chambers are adjacent, any consecutive pair $C_{i-1},C_i$ of chambers share all but one vertex. Denote the color of this vertex by $s_i$. The Weyl distance function between $C_0$ and $C_n$ is defined by

$$\delta(C_0,C_n) = s_1s_2\cdots s_n.$$

It can be shown that this does not depend on the choice of gallery connecting $C_0$ and $C_n$.

Now, a building is a simplicial complex that is organized into apartments, each of which is a Coxeter complex (satisfying some coherence axioms). Buildings are colorable, since the Coxeter complexes that make them up are colorable. A coloring of a building is associated with a uniform choice of Weyl group for the Coxeter complexes that make it up, allowing it to be regarded as a collection of words on the set of colors with relations. Now, if $C_0,\dots,C_n$ is a gallery in a building, then define the Weyl distance between $C_0$ and $C_n$ by

$$\delta(C_0,C_n) = s_1s_2\cdots s_n$$

where the $s_i$ are as above. As in the case of Coxeter complexes, this does not depend on the choice of gallery connecting the chambers $C_0$ and $C_n$.

The gallery distance $d(C_0,C_n)$ is defined as the minimal word length needed to express $\delta(C_0,C_n)$ in the Weyl group. Symbolically, $d(C_0,C_n)=\ell(\delta(C_0,C_n))$.

== Properties ==
The Weyl distance function satisfies several properties that parallel those of distance functions in metric spaces:

- $\delta(C,D) = 1$ if and only if $C=D$ (the group element 1 corresponds to the empty word on S). This corresponds to the property $d(C,D)=0$ if and only if $C=D$ of the gallery metric (Abramenko & Brown 2008, p. 199):
- $\delta(C,D)=\delta(D,C)^{-1}$ (inversion corresponds to reversal of words in the alphabet S). This corresponds to symmetry $d(C,D)=d(D,C)$ of the gallery metric.
- If $\delta(C',C)=s\in S$ and $\delta(C,D)=w$, then $\delta(C',D)$ is either w or sw. Moreover, if $\ell(sw)=\ell(w)+1$, then $\delta(C',D)=sw$. This corresponds to the triangle inequality.

== Abstract characterization of buildings ==
In addition to the properties listed above, the Weyl distance function satisfies the following property:

- If $\delta(C,D)=w$, then for any $s\in S$ there is a chamber $C'$, such that $\delta(C',C)=s$ and $\delta(C',D)=sw$.

In fact, this property together with the two listed in the "Properties" section furnishes an abstract "metrical" characterization of buildings, as follows. Suppose that (W,S) is a Coxeter system consisting of a Weyl group W generated by reflections belonging to the subset S. A building of type (W,S) is a pair consisting of a set C of chambers and a function:

$$\delta:C\times C\to W$$

such that the three properties listed above are satisfied. Then C carries the canonical structure of a building, in which δ is the Weyl distance function.
