= Riemann–Roch-type theorem =

Theorem in geometry

In algebraic geometry, there are various generalizations of the Riemann–Roch theorem; among the most famous is the Grothendieck–Riemann–Roch theorem, which is further generalized by the formulation due to Fulton et al.

== Formulation due to Baum, Fulton and MacPherson ==
Let $G_*$ and $A_*$ be functors on the category C of schemes separated and locally of finite type over the base field k with proper morphisms such that

- $G_*(X)$ is the Grothendieck group of coherent sheaves on X,
- $A_*(X)$ is the rational Chow group of X,
- for each proper morphism f, $G_*(f), A_*(f)$ are the direct images (or push-forwards) along f.

Also, if $f: X \to Y$ is a (global) local complete intersection morphism; i.e., it factors as a closed regular embedding $X \hookrightarrow P$ into a smooth scheme P followed by a smooth morphism $P \to Y$, then let

$$T_f = [T_{P/Y}|_X] - [N_{X/P}]$$

be the class in the Grothendieck group of vector bundles on X; it is independent of the factorization and is called the virtual tangent bundle of f.

Then the Riemann–Roch theorem then amounts to the construction of a unique natural transformation:

$$\tau: G_* \to A_*$$

between the two functors such that for each scheme X in C, the homomorphism $\tau_X : G(X) \to A(X)$ satisfies: for a local complete intersection morphism $f: X \to Y$, when there are closed embeddings $X \subset M, Y \subset P$ into smooth schemes,

$$\tau_X f^* = \operatorname{td}(T_f) \cdot f^* \tau_Y$$

where $\operatorname{td}$ refers to the Todd class.

Moreover, it has the properties:

- $\tau_X(\beta \otimes \alpha) = \operatorname{ch}(\beta) \tau(\alpha)$ for each $\alpha \in G_*(X)$ and the Chern class $\operatorname{ch}(\beta)$ (or the action of it) of the $\beta$ in the Grothendieck group of vector bundles on X.
- it X is a closed subscheme of a smooth scheme M, then the theorem is (roughly) the restriction of the theorem in the smooth case and can be written down in terms of a localized Chern class.

== The equivariant Riemann–Roch theorem ==
Over the complex numbers, the theorem is (or can be interpreted as) a special case of the equivariant index theorem.

== The Riemann–Roch theorem for Deligne–Mumford stacks ==
Aside from algebraic spaces, no straightforward generalization is possible for stacks. The complication already appears in the orbifold case (Kawasaki's Riemann–Roch).

The equivariant Riemann–Roch theorem for finite groups is equivalent in many situations to the Riemann–Roch theorem for quotient stacks by finite groups.

One of the significant applications of the theorem is that it allows one to define a virtual fundamental class in terms of the K-theoretic virtual fundamental class.

== See also ==
- Kawasaki's Riemann–Roch formula
