= Building (mathematics) =

Mathematical structure

In mathematics, a building (also Tits building, named after Jacques Tits) is a combinatorial and geometric structure which simultaneously generalizes certain aspects of flag manifolds, finite projective planes, and Riemannian symmetric spaces. Buildings were initially introduced by Jacques Tits as a means to understand the structure of isotropic reductive linear algebraic groups over arbitrary fields. The more specialized theory of Bruhat–Tits buildings (named also after François Bruhat) plays a role in the study of p-adic Lie groups analogous to that of the theory of symmetric spaces in the theory of Lie groups.

== Overview ==
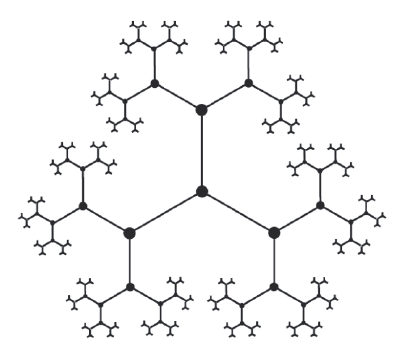
The Bruhat–Tits tree for the 2-adic Lie group SL(2, Q_{2}).

The notion of a building was invented by Jacques Tits as a means of describing simple algebraic groups over an arbitrary field. Tits demonstrated how to every such group G one can associate a simplicial complex Δ = Δ(G) with an action of G, called the spherical building of G. The group G imposes very strong combinatorial regularity conditions on the complexes Δ that can arise in this fashion. By treating these conditions as axioms for a class of simplicial complexes, Tits arrived at his first definition of a building. A part of the data defining a building Δ is a Coxeter group W, which determines a highly symmetrical simplicial complex Σ = Σ(W, S), called the Coxeter complex. A building Δ is glued together from multiple copies of Σ, called its apartments, in a certain regular fashion. When W is a finite Coxeter group, the Coxeter complex is a topological sphere, and the corresponding buildings are said to be of spherical type. When W is an affine Weyl group, the Coxeter complex is a subdivision of the affine plane and one speaks of affine, or Euclidean, buildings. An affine building of type Ã_{1} is the same as an infinite tree without terminal vertices.

Although the theory of semisimple algebraic groups provided the initial motivation for the notion of a building, not all buildings arise from a group. In particular, projective planes and generalized quadrangles form two classes of graphs studied in incidence geometry which satisfy the axioms of a building, but may not be connected with any group. This phenomenon turns out to be related to the low rank of the corresponding Coxeter system (namely, two). Tits proved a remarkable theorem: all spherical buildings of rank at least three are connected with a group; moreover, if a building of rank at least two is connected with a group then the group is essentially determined by the building.

Iwahori–Matsumoto, Borel–Tits and Bruhat–Tits demonstrated that in analogy with Tits' construction of spherical buildings, affine buildings can also be constructed from certain groups, namely, reductive algebraic groups over a local non-Archimedean field. Furthermore, if the split rank of the group is at least three, it is essentially determined by its building. Tits later reworked the foundational aspects of the theory of buildings using the notion of a chamber system, encoding the building solely in terms of adjacency properties of simplices of maximal dimension; this leads to simplifications in both spherical and affine cases. He proved that, in analogy with the spherical case, every building of affine type and rank at least four arises from a group.

== Definition ==
An n-dimensional building X is an abstract simplicial complex which is a union of subcomplexes A called apartments such that

- every k-simplex of X is within at least three n-simplices if k < n;
- any (n – 1)-simplex in an apartment A lies in exactly two adjacent n-simplices of A and the graph of adjacent n-simplices is connected;
- any two simplices in X lie in some common apartment A;
- if two simplices both lie in apartments A and A′, then there is a simplicial isomorphism of A onto A′ fixing the vertices of the two simplices.

An n-simplex in A is called a chamber (originally chambre, i.e., room in French).

The rank of the building is defined to be n + 1.

== Elementary properties ==
Every apartment A in a building is a Coxeter complex. In fact, for every two n-simplices intersecting in an (n – 1)-simplex or panel, there is a unique period two simplicial automorphism of A, called a reflection, carrying one n-simplex onto the other and fixing their common points. These reflections generate a Coxeter group W, called the Weyl group of A, and the simplicial complex A corresponds to the standard geometric realization of W. Standard generators of the Coxeter group are given by the reflections in the walls of a fixed chamber in A. Since the apartment A is determined up to isomorphism by the building, the same is true of any two simplices in X lying in some common apartment A. When W is finite, the building is said to be spherical. When it is an affine Weyl group, the building is said to be affine or Euclidean.

The chamber system is the adjacency graph formed by the chambers; each pair of adjacent chambers can in addition be labelled by one of the standard generators of the Coxeter group.

Every building has a canonical length metric inherited from the geometric realisation obtained by identifying the vertices with an orthonormal basis of a Hilbert space. For affine buildings, this metric satisfies the CAT(0) comparison inequality of Alexandrov, known in this setting as the Bruhat–Tits non-positive curvature condition for geodesic triangles: the distance from a vertex to the midpoint of the opposite side is no greater than the distance in the corresponding Euclidean triangle with the same side-lengths.

== Connection with (B, N) pairs ==
If a group G acts simplicially on a building X, transitively on pairs (C, A) of chambers C and apartments A containing them, then the stabilisers of such a pair define a (B, N) pair or Tits system. In fact the pair of subgroups

B = G_{C} and N = G_{A}

satisfies the axioms of a (B, N) pair and the Weyl group can be identified with N / N ∩ B.

Conversely the building can be recovered from the (B, N) pair, so that every (B, N) pair canonically defines a building. In fact, using the terminology of (B, N) pairs and calling any conjugate of B a Borel subgroup and any group containing a Borel subgroup a parabolic subgroup,

- the vertices of the building X correspond to maximal parabolic subgroups;
- k + 1 vertices form a k-simplex whenever the intersection of the corresponding maximal parabolic subgroups is also parabolic;
- apartments are conjugates under G of the simplicial subcomplex with vertices given by conjugates under N of maximal parabolics containing B.

The same building can often be described by different (B, N) pairs. Moreover, not every building comes from a (B, N) pair: this corresponds to the failure of classification results in low rank and dimension (see below).

The Solomon-Tits theorem is a result which states the homotopy type of a building of a group of Lie type is the same as that of a bouquet of spheres.

== Spherical and affine buildings for SL_{n} ==
The simplicial structure of the affine and spherical buildings associated to SL_{n}(Q_{p}), as well as their interconnections, are easy to explain directly using only concepts from elementary algebra and geometry. In this case there are three different buildings, two spherical and one affine. Each is a union of apartments, themselves simplicial complexes. For the affine building, an apartment is a simplicial complex tessellating Euclidean space E^{n−1} by (n − 1)-dimensional simplices; while for a spherical building it is the finite simplicial complex formed by all (n − 1)! simplices with a given common vertex in the analogous tessellation in E^{n−2}.

Each building is a simplicial complex X which has to satisfy the following axioms:

- X is a union of apartments.
- Any two simplices in X are contained in a common apartment.
- If a simplex is contained in two apartments, there is a simplicial isomorphism of one onto the other fixing all common points.

=== Spherical building ===
Let F be a field and let X be the simplicial complex with vertices the non-trivial vector subspaces of V = F^{n}. Two subspaces U_{1} and U_{2} are connected if one of them is a subset of the other. The k-simplices of X are formed by sets of k + 1 mutually connected subspaces. Maximal connectivity is obtained by taking n − 1 proper non-trivial subspaces and the corresponding (n − 1)-simplex corresponds to a complete flag

(0) ⊂ U_{1} ⊂ ··· ⊂ U_{n – 1} ⊂ V

Lower dimensional simplices correspond to partial flags with fewer intermediary subspaces U_{i}.

To define the apartments in X, it is convenient to define a frame in V as a basis (v_{i}) determined up to scalar multiplication of each of its vectors v_{i}; in other words a frame is a set of one-dimensional subspaces L_{i} = F·v_{i} such that any k of them generate a k-dimensional subspace. Now an ordered frame L_{1}, ..., L_{n} defines a complete flag via

U_{i} = L_{1} ⊕ ··· ⊕ L_{i}

Since reorderings of the various L_{i} also give a frame, it is straightforward to see that the subspaces, obtained as sums of the L_{i}, form a simplicial complex of the type required for an apartment of a spherical building. The axioms for a building can easily be verified using the classical Schreier refinement argument used to prove the uniqueness of the Jordan–Hölder decomposition.

=== Affine building ===
Let K be a field lying between Q and its p-adic completion Q_{p} with respect to the usual non-Archimedean p-adic norm ‖x‖_{p} on Q for some prime p. Let R be the subring of K defined by

R = { x : ‖x‖_{p} ≤ 1 }

When K = Q, R is the localization of Z at p and, when K = Q_{p}, R = Z_{p}, the p-adic integers, i.e., the closure of Z in Q_{p}.

The vertices of the building X are the R-lattices in V = K^{n}, i.e., R-submodules of the form

L = R·v_{1} ⊕ ··· ⊕ R·v_{n}

where (v_{i}) is a basis of V over K. Two lattices are said to be equivalent if one is a scalar multiple of the other by an element of the multiplicative group K* of K (in fact only integer powers of p need be used). Two lattices L_{1} and L_{2} are said to be adjacent if some lattice equivalent to L_{2} lies between L_{1} and its sublattice p·L_{1}: this relation is symmetric. The k-simplices of X are equivalence classes of k + 1 mutually adjacent lattices, The (n − 1)-simplices correspond, after relabelling, to chains

p·L_{n} ⊂ L_{1} ⊂ L_{2} ⊂ ··· ⊂ L_{n – 1} ⊂ L_{n}

where each successive quotient has order p. Apartments are defined by fixing a basis (v_{i}) of V and taking all lattices with basis (p^{a_{i}} v_{i}) where (a_{i}) lies in Z^{n} and is uniquely determined up to addition of the same integer to each entry.

By definition each apartment has the required form and their union is the whole of X. The second axiom follows by a variant of the Schreier refinement argument. The last axiom follows by a simple counting argument based on the orders of finite Abelian groups of the form

L + p^{k} ·L_{i} / p^{k} ·L_{i}

A standard compactness argument shows that X is in fact independent of the choice of K. In particular taking K = Q, it follows that X is countable. On the other hand, taking K = Q_{p}, the definition shows that GL_{n}(Q_{p}) admits a natural simplicial action on the building.

The building comes equipped with a labelling of its vertices with values in Z / nZ. Indeed, fixing a reference lattice L, the label of M is given by

label(M) = log_{p} |M / p^{k} L| modulo n

for k sufficiently large. The vertices of any (n – 1)-simplex in X has distinct labels, running through the whole of Z / nZ. Any simplicial automorphism φ of X defines a permutation π of Z / nZ such that label(φ(M)) = π(label(M)). In particular for g in GL_{n}(Q_{p}),

label(g·M) = label(M) + log_{p} ‖det g‖_{p} modulo n.

Thus g preserves labels if g lies in SL_{n}(Q_{p}).

=== Automorphisms ===
Tits proved that any label-preserving automorphism of the affine building arises from an element of SL_{n}(Q_{p}). Since automorphisms of the building permute the labels, there is a natural homomorphism

Aut X → S_{n}.

The action of GL_{n}(Q_{p}) gives rise to an n-cycle τ. Other automorphisms of the building arise from outer automorphisms of SL_{n}(Q_{p}) associated with automorphisms of the Dynkin diagram. Taking the standard symmetric bilinear form with orthonormal basis v_{i}, the map sending a lattice to its dual lattice gives an automorphism whose square is the identity, giving the permutation σ that sends each label to its negative modulo n. The image of the above homomorphism is generated by σ and τ and is isomorphic to the dihedral group D_{n} of order 2n; when n = 3, it gives the whole of S_{3}.

If E is a finite Galois extension of Q_{p} and the building is constructed from SL_{n}(E) instead of SL_{n}(Q_{p}), the Galois group Gal(E / Q_{p}) will also act by automorphisms on the building.

=== Geometric relations ===
Spherical buildings arise in two quite different ways in connection with the affine building X for SL_{n}(Q_{p}):

- The link of each vertex L in the affine building corresponds to submodules of L / p·L under the finite field F = R / p·R = Z / (p). This is just the spherical building for SL_{n}(F).
- The building X can be compactified by adding the spherical building for SL_{n}(Q_{p}) as boundary "at infinity".

=== Bruhat–Tits trees with complex multiplication ===
When L is an archimedean local field then on the building for the group SL_{2}(L) an additional structure can be imposed of a building with complex multiplication. These were first introduced by Martin L. Brown. These buildings arise when a quadratic extension of L acts on the vector space L^{2}. These building with complex multiplication can be extended to any global field. They describe the action of the Hecke operators on Heegner points on the classical modular curve X_{0}(N) as well as on the Drinfeld modular curve X^{Drin}_{0}(I). These buildings with complex multiplication are completely classified for the case of SL_{2}(L) by Brown.

== Classification ==
Tits proved that all irreducible spherical buildings (i.e., with finite Weyl group) of rank greater than 2 are associated to simple algebraic groups, to classical groups (possibly infinite-dimensional), or to a special class of groups called "of mixed type" that only exist in characteristic 2 or 3. A similar result holds for irreducible affine buildings of dimension greater than 2 (their buildings "at infinity" are spherical of rank greater than two).

In lower rank or dimension, there is no such classification. Indeed, the spherical buildings of rank 2 are precisely the generalized polygons, and a plethora of examples exist. (There are free constructions of infinite generalized n-gons for every $n \geq 3$.) Many 2-dimensional affine buildings have been constructed using hyperbolic reflection groups or other more exotic constructions connected with orbifolds.

Tits also proved that every time a building is described by a (B, N) pair in a group, then in almost all cases the automorphisms of the building correspond to automorphisms of the group.

== Applications ==
The theory of buildings has important applications in several rather disparate fields. Besides the already mentioned connections with the structure of reductive algebraic groups over general and local fields, buildings are used to study their representations. The results of Tits on determination of a group by its building have deep connections with rigidity theorems of George Mostow and Grigory Margulis, and with Margulis arithmeticity.

Special types of buildings are studied in discrete mathematics, and the idea of a geometric approach to characterizing simple groups proved very fruitful in the classification of finite simple groups. The theory of buildings of type more general than spherical or affine is still relatively undeveloped, but these generalized buildings have already found applications to construction of Kac–Moody groups in algebra, and to nonpositively curved manifolds and hyperbolic groups in topology and geometric group theory.

== See also ==
- Buekenhout geometry
- Coxeter group
- (B, N) pair
- Affine Hecke algebra
- Bruhat decomposition
- Generalized polygon
- Mostow rigidity
- Coxeter complex
- Weyl distance function
