= Orbifold =

Generalized manifold

This terminology should not be blamed on me. It was obtained by a democratic process in my course of 1976–77. An orbifold is something with many folds; unfortunately, the word "manifold" already has a different definition. I tried "foldamani", which was quickly displaced by the suggestion of "manifolded". After two months of patiently saying "no, not a manifold, a manifoldead," we held a vote, and "orbifold" won.

— Thurston (1978–1981, p. 300, section 13.2) explaining the origin of the word "orbifold"

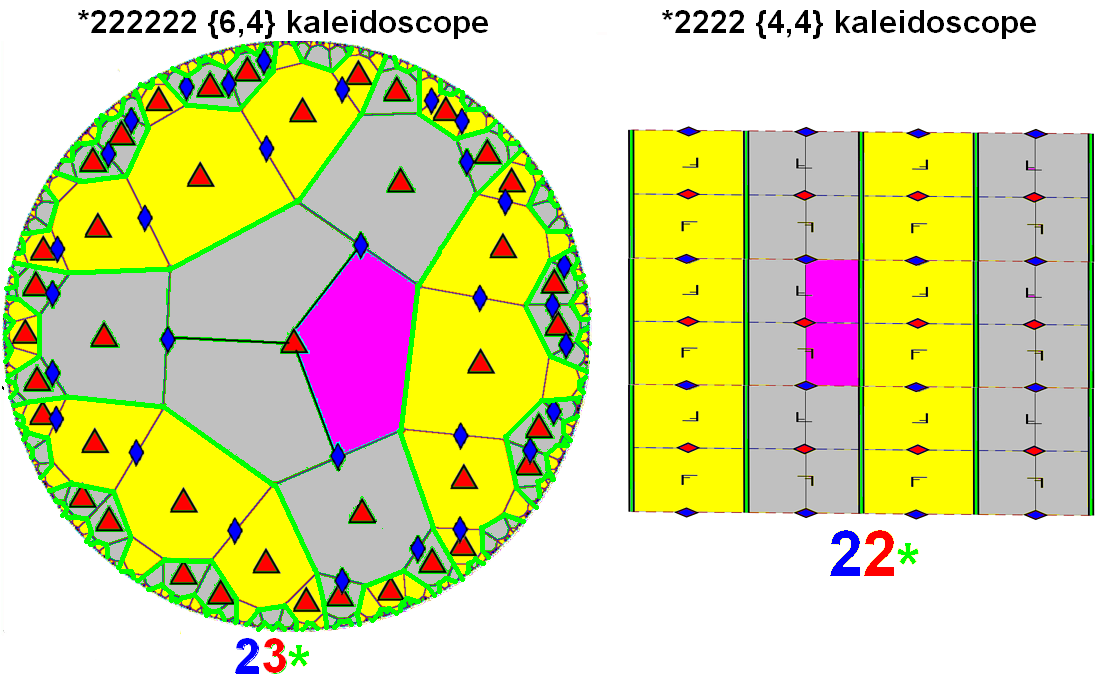
23star Orbifold Example

In the mathematical disciplines of topology and geometry, an orbifold (for "orbit-manifold") is a generalization of a manifold. Roughly speaking, an orbifold is a topological space that is locally a finite group quotient of a Euclidean space.

Definitions of orbifold have been given several times: by Ichirō Satake in the context of automorphic forms in the 1950s under the name V-manifold; by William Thurston in the context of the geometry of 3-manifolds in the 1970s when he coined the name orbifold, after a vote by his students; and by André Haefliger in the 1980s in the context of Mikhail Gromov's programme on CAT(k) spaces under the name orbihedron.

Historically, orbifolds arose first as surfaces with singular points long before they were formally defined. One of the first classical examples arose in the theory of modular forms with the action of the modular group $\mathrm{SL}(2,\Z)$ on the upper half-plane: a version of the Riemann–Roch theorem holds after the quotient is compactified by the addition of two orbifold cusp points. In 3-manifold theory, the theory of Seifert fiber spaces, initiated by Herbert Seifert, can be phrased in terms of 2-dimensional orbifolds. In geometric group theory, post-Gromov, discrete groups have been studied in terms of the local curvature properties of orbihedra and their covering spaces.

In string theory, the word "orbifold" has a slightly different meaning, discussed in detail below. In two-dimensional conformal field theory, it refers to the theory attached to the fixed point subalgebra of a vertex algebra under the action of a finite group of automorphisms.

The main example of underlying space is a quotient space of a manifold under the properly discontinuous action of a possibly infinite group of diffeomorphisms with finite isotropy subgroups. In particular this applies to any action of a finite group; thus a manifold with boundary carries a natural orbifold structure, since it is the quotient of its double by an action of $\Z_2$.

One topological space can carry different orbifold structures. For example, consider the orbifold $O$ associated with a quotient space of the 2-sphere along a rotation by $\pi$ ; it is homeomorphic to the 2-sphere, but the natural orbifold structure is different. It is possible to adopt most of the characteristics of manifolds to orbifolds and these characteristics are usually different from correspondent characteristics of underlying space. In the above example, the orbifold fundamental group of $O$ is $\Z_2$ and its orbifold Euler characteristic is 1.

== Formal definitions ==
=== Definition using orbifold atlas ===
Like a manifold, an orbifold is specified by local conditions; however, instead of being locally modelled on open subsets of $\R^n$, an orbifold is locally modelled on quotients of open subsets of $\R^n$ by finite group actions. The structure of an orbifold encodes not only that of the underlying quotient space, which need not be a manifold, but also that of the isotropy subgroups.

An $n$-dimensional orbifold is a Hausdorff topological space $X$, called the underlying space, with a covering by a collection of open sets $U_i$, closed under finite intersection. For each $U_i$, there is

- an open subset $V_i$ of $\R^n$, invariant under a faithful linear action of a finite group $\Gamma_i$;
- a continuous map $\varphi_i$ of $V_i$ onto $U_i$ invariant under $\Gamma_i$, called an orbifold chart, which defines a homeomorphism between $V_i/\Gamma_i$ and $U_i$.

The collection of orbifold charts is called an orbifold atlas if the following properties are satisfied:

- for each inclusion $U_i\subset U_j$ there is an injective group homomorphism $f_{ij}:\Gamma_i\rightarrow\Gamma_j$.
- for each inclusion $U_i\subset U_j$ there is a $\Gamma_i$-equivariant homeomorphism $\psi_{ij}$, called a gluing map, of $V_i$ onto an open subset of $V_j$.
- the gluing maps are compatible with the charts, i.e. $\varphi_j\circ\psi_{ij} = \varphi_i$.
- the gluing maps are unique up to composition with group elements, i.e. any other possible gluing map from $V_i$ to $V_j$ has the form $g\circ\psi_{ij}$ for a unique $g\in\Gamma_j$.

As for atlases on manifolds, two orbifold atlases of $X$ are equivalent if they can be consistently combined to give a larger orbifold atlas. An orbifold structure is therefore an equivalence class of orbifold atlases.

Note that the orbifold structure determines the isotropy subgroup of any point of the orbifold up to isomorphism: it can be computed as the stabilizer of the point in any orbifold chart. If U_{i} $\subset$ U_{j} $\subset$ U_{k}, then there is a unique transition element g_{ijk} in Γ_{k} such that

g_{ijk}·ψ_{ik} = ψ_{jk}·ψ_{ij}

These transition elements satisfy

(Ad g_{ijk})·f_{ik} = f_{jk}·f_{ij}

as well as the cocycle relation (guaranteeing associativity)

f_{km}(g_{ijk})·g_{ikm} = g_{ijm}·g_{jkm}.

More generally, attached to an open covering of an orbifold by orbifold charts, there is the combinatorial data of a so-called complex of groups (see below).

Exactly as in the case of manifolds, differentiability conditions can be imposed on the gluing maps to give a definition of a differentiable orbifold. It will be a Riemannian orbifold if in addition there are invariant Riemannian metrics on the orbifold charts and the gluing maps are isometries.

=== Definition using Lie groupoids ===
Recall that a groupoid consists of a set of objects $G_0$, a set of arrows $G_1$, and structural maps including the source and the target maps $s, t: G_1 \to G_0$ and other maps allowing arrows to be composed and inverted. It is called a Lie groupoid if both $G_0$ and $G_1$ are smooth manifolds, all structural maps are smooth, and both the source and the target maps are submersions. The intersection of the source and the target fiber at a given point $x \in G_0$, i.e. the set $(G_1)_x := s^{-1}(x) \cap t^{-1}(x)$, is the Lie group called the isotropy group of $G_1$ at $x$. A Lie groupoid is called proper if the map $(s,t): G_1 \to G_0 \times G_0$ is a proper map, and étale if both the source and the target maps are local diffeomorphisms.

An orbifold groupoid is given by one of the following equivalent definitions:

- a proper étale Lie groupoid;
- a proper Lie groupoid whose isotropies are discrete spaces.

Since the isotropy groups of proper groupoids are automatically compact, the discreteness condition implies that the isotropies must be actually finite groups.

Orbifold groupoids play the same role as orbifold atlases in the definition above. Indeed, an orbifold structure on a Hausdorff topological space $X$ is defined as the Morita equivalence class of an orbifold groupoid $G \rightrightarrows M$ together with a homeomorphism $|M/G| \simeq X$, where $|M/G|$ is the orbit space of the Lie groupoid $G$ (i.e. the quotient of $M$ by the equivalent relation when $x \sim y$ if there is a $g \in G$ with $s(g)=x$ and $t(g)=y$). This definition shows that orbifolds are a particular kind of differentiable stack.

== Relation between the two definitions ==
Given an orbifold atlas on a space $X$, one can build a pseudogroup made up by all diffeomorphisms between open sets of $X$ which preserve the transition functions $\varphi_i$. In turn, the space $G_X$ of germs of its elements is an orbifold groupoid. Moreover, since by definition of orbifold atlas each finite group $\Gamma_i$ acts faithfully on $V_i$, the groupoid $G_X$ is automatically effective, i.e. the map $g \in (G_X)_x \mapsto \mathrm{germ}_x (t \circ s^{-1})$ is injective for every $x \in X$. Two different orbifold atlases give rise to the same orbifold structure if and only if their associated orbifold groupoids are Morita equivalent. Therefore, any orbifold structure according to the first definition (also called a classical orbifold) is a special kind of orbifold structure according to the second definition.

Conversely, given an orbifold groupoid $G \rightrightarrows M$, there is a canonical orbifold atlas over its orbit space, whose associated effective orbifold groupoid is Morita equivalent to $G$. Since the orbit spaces of Morita equivalent groupoids are homeomorphic, an orbifold structure according to the second definition reduces an orbifold structure according to the first definition in the effective case.

Accordingly, while the notion of orbifold atlas is simpler and more commonly present in the literature, the notion of orbifold groupoid is particularly useful when discussing non-effective orbifolds and maps between orbifolds. For example, a map between orbifolds can be described by a homomorphism between groupoids, which carries more information than the underlying continuous map between the underlying topological spaces.

== Examples ==
- Any manifold without boundary is trivially an orbifold, where each of the groups Γ_{i} is the trivial group. Equivalently, it corresponds to the Morita equivalence class of the unit groupoid.
- If N is a compact manifold with boundary, its double M can be formed by gluing together a copy of N and its mirror image along their common boundary. There is natural reflection action of Z_{2} on the manifold M fixing the common boundary; the quotient space can be identified with N, so that N has a natural orbifold structure.
- If M is a Riemannian n-manifold with a cocompact proper isometric action of a discrete group Γ, then the orbit space X = M/Γ has natural orbifold structure: for each x in X take a representative m in M and an open neighbourhood V_{m} of m invariant under the stabiliser Γ_{m}, identified equivariantly with a Γ_{m}-subset of T_{m}M under the exponential map at m; finitely many neighbourhoods cover X and each of their finite intersections, if non-empty, is covered by an intersection of Γ-translates g_{m}·V_{m} with corresponding group g_{m} Γ g_{m}^{−1}. Orbifolds that arise in this way are called developable or good.
- A classical theorem of Henri Poincaré constructs Fuchsian groups as hyperbolic reflection groups generated by reflections in the edges of a geodesic triangle in the hyperbolic plane for the Poincaré metric. If the triangle has angles π/n_{i} for positive integers n_{i}, the triangle is a fundamental domain and naturally a 2-dimensional orbifold. The corresponding group is an example of a hyperbolic triangle group. Poincaré also gave a 3-dimensional version of this result for Kleinian groups: in this case the Kleinian group Γ is generated by hyperbolic reflections and the orbifold is H^{3} / Γ.
- If M is a closed 2-manifold, new orbifold structures can be defined on M by removing finitely many disjoint closed discs from M and gluing back copies of discs D/ Γ_{i} where D is the closed unit disc and Γ_{i} is a finite cyclic group of rotations. This generalises Poincaré's construction.

== Orbifold fundamental group ==
There are several ways to define the orbifold fundamental group. More sophisticated approaches use orbifold covering spaces or classifying spaces of groupoids. The simplest approach (adopted by Haefliger and known also to Thurston) extends the usual notion of loop used in the standard definition of the fundamental group.

An orbifold path is a path in the underlying space provided with an explicit piecewise lift of path segments to orbifold charts and explicit group elements identifying paths in overlapping charts; if the underlying path is a loop, it is called an orbifold loop. Two orbifold paths are identified if they are related through multiplication by group elements in orbifold charts. The orbifold fundamental group is the group formed by homotopy classes of orbifold loops.

If the orbifold arises as the quotient of a simply connected manifold M by a proper rigid action of a discrete group Γ, the orbifold fundamental group can be identified with Γ. In general it is an extension of Γ by π_{1} M.

The orbifold is said to be developable or good if it arises as the quotient by a group action; otherwise it is called bad. A universal covering orbifold can be constructed for an orbifold by direct analogy with the construction of the universal covering space of a topological space, namely as the space of pairs consisting of points of the orbifold and homotopy classes of orbifold paths joining them to the basepoint. This space is naturally an orbifold.

Note that if an orbifold chart on a contractible open subset corresponds to a group Γ, then there is a natural local homomorphism of Γ into the orbifold fundamental group.

In fact the following conditions are equivalent:

- The orbifold is developable.
- The orbifold structure on the universal covering orbifold is trivial.
- The local homomorphisms are all injective for a covering by contractible open sets.

=== Orbifolds as diffeologies ===
Orbifolds can be defined in the general framework of diffeology and have been proved to be equivalent to Ichirô Satake's original definition:

Definition: An orbifold is a diffeological space locally diffeomorphic at each point to some $\R^n/G$, where $n$ is an integer and $G$ is a finite linear group which may change from point to point.

This definition calls a few remarks:

- This definition mimics the definition of a manifold in diffeology, which is a diffeological space locally diffeomorphic at each point to $\R^n$.
- An orbifold is regarded first as a diffeological space, a set equipped with a diffeology. Then, the diffeology is tested to be locally diffeomorphic at each point to a quotient $\R^n/G$ with $G$ a finite linear group.
- This definition is equivalent with Haefliger orbifolds.
- {Orbifolds} makes a subcategory of the category {Diffeology} whose objects are diffeological spaces and morphisms smooth maps. A smooth map between orbifolds is any map which is smooth for their diffeologies. This resolves, in the context of Satake's definition, his remark: "The notion of $C^\infty$-map thus defined is inconvenient in the point that a composite of two $C^\infty$-map defined in a different choice of defining families is not always a $C^\infty$-map." Indeed, there are smooth maps between orbifolds that do not lift locally as equivariant maps.

Note that the fundamental group of an orbifold as a diffeological space is not the same as the fundamental group as defined above. That last one is related to the structure groupoid and its isotropy groups.

== Orbispaces ==
For applications in geometric group theory, it is often convenient to have a slightly more general notion of orbifold, due to Haefliger. An orbispace is to topological spaces what an orbifold is to manifolds. It is defined by replacing the model for the orbifold charts by a locally compact space with a rigid action of a finite group, i.e. one for which points with trivial isotropy are dense. (This condition is automatically satisfied by faithful linear actions, because the points fixed by any non-trivial group element form a proper linear subspace.) It is also useful to consider metric space structures on an orbispace, given by invariant metrics on the orbispace charts for which the gluing maps preserve distance. In this case each orbispace chart is usually required to be a length space with unique geodesics connecting any two points.

Let X be an orbispace endowed with a metric space structure for which the charts are geodesic length spaces. The preceding definitions and results for orbifolds can be generalized to give definitions of orbispace fundamental group and universal covering orbispace, with analogous criteria for developability. The distance functions on the orbispace charts can be used to define the length of an orbispace path in the universal covering orbispace. If the distance function in each chart is non-positively curved, then the Birkhoff curve shortening argument can be used to prove that any orbispace path with fixed endpoints is homotopic to a unique geodesic. Applying this to constant paths in an orbispace chart, it follows that each local homomorphism is injective and hence:

- every non-positively curved orbispace is developable (i.e. good).

== Complexes of groups ==
Every orbifold has associated with it an additional combinatorial structure given by a complex of groups.

=== Definition ===
A complex of groups (Y,f,g) on an abstract simplicial complex Y is given by

- a finite group Γ_{σ} for each simplex σ of Y
- an injective homomorphism f_{στ} : Γ_{τ} $\rightarrow$ Γ_{σ} whenever σ $\subset$ τ
- for every inclusion ρ $\subset$ σ $\subset$ τ, a group element g_{ρστ} in Γ_{ρ} such that (Ad g_{ρστ})·f_{ρτ} = f_{ρσ}·f_{στ} (here Ad denotes the adjoint action by conjugation)

The group elements must in addition satisfy the cocycle condition

f_{πρ}(g_{ρστ}) g_{πρτ} = g_{πστ} g_{πρσ}

for every chain of simplices $\pi \subset \rho\subset \sigma \subset \tau.$ (This condition is vacuous if Y has dimension 2 or less.)

Any choice of elements h_{στ} in Γ_{σ} yields an equivalent complex of groups by defining

- f'_{στ} = (Ad h_{στ})·f_{στ}
- g'_{ρστ} = h_{ρσ}·f_{ρσ}(h_{στ})·g_{ρστ}·h_{ρτ}^{−1}

A complex of groups is called simple whenever g_{ρστ} = 1 everywhere.

- An easy inductive argument shows that every complex of groups on a simplex is equivalent to a complex of groups with g_{ρστ} = 1 everywhere.

It is often more convenient and conceptually appealing to pass to the barycentric subdivision of Y. The vertices of this subdivision correspond to the simplices of Y, so that each vertex has a group attached to it. The edges of the barycentric subdivision are naturally oriented (corresponding to inclusions of simplices) and each directed edge gives an inclusion of groups. Each triangle has a transition element attached to it belonging to the group of exactly one vertex; and the tetrahedra, if there are any, give cocycle relations for the transition elements. Thus a complex of groups involves only the 3-skeleton of the barycentric subdivision; and only the 2-skeleton if it is simple.

=== Example ===
If X is an orbifold (or orbispace), choose a covering by open subsets from amongst the orbifold charts f_{i}: V_{i} $\rightarrow$ U_{i}. Let Y be the abstract simplicial complex given by the nerve of the covering: its vertices are the sets of the cover and its n-simplices correspond to non-empty intersections U_{α} = U_{i_{1}} $\cap$ ··· $\cap$ U_{i_{n}}. For each such simplex there is an associated group Γ_{α} and the homomorphisms f_{ij} become the homomorphisms f_{στ}. For every triple ρ $\subset$ σ $\subset$ τ corresponding to intersections

$$U_i \supset U_i \cap U_j \supset U_i \cap U_j \cap U_k$$

there are charts φ_{i} : V_{i} $\rightarrow$ U_{i}, φ_{ij} : V_{ij} $\rightarrow$ U_{i} $\cap$ U_{j} and φ_{ijk} : V_{ijk} $\rightarrow$ U_{i} $\cap$ U_{j} $\cap$ U_{k} and gluing maps ψ : V_{ij} $\rightarrow$ V_{i}, ψ' : V_{ijk} $\rightarrow$ V_{ij} and ψ" : V_{ijk} $\rightarrow$ V_{i}.

There is a unique transition element g_{ρστ} in Γ_{i} such that g_{ρστ}·ψ" = ψ·ψ′. The relations satisfied by the transition elements of an orbifold imply those required for a complex of groups. In this way a complex of groups can be canonically associated to the nerve of an open covering by orbifold (or orbispace) charts. In the language of non-commutative sheaf theory and gerbes, the complex of groups in this case arises as a sheaf of groups associated to the covering U_{i}; the data g_{ρστ} is a 2-cocycle in non-commutative sheaf cohomology and the data h_{στ} gives a 2-coboundary perturbation.

=== Edge-path group ===
The edge-path group of a complex of groups can be defined as a natural generalisation of the edge path group of a simplicial complex. In the barycentric subdivision of Y, take generators e_{ij} corresponding to edges from i to j where i $\rightarrow$ j, so that there is an injection ψ_{ij} : Γ_{i} $\rightarrow$ Γ_{j}. Let Γ be the group generated by the e_{ij} and Γ_{k} with relations

e_{ij} ^{−1} · g · e_{ij} = ψ_{ij}(g)

for g in Γ_{i} and

e_{ik} = e_{jk}·e_{ij}·g_{ijk}

if i $\rightarrow$ j $\rightarrow$ k.

For a fixed vertex i_{0}, the edge-path group Γ(i_{0}) is defined to be the subgroup of Γ generated by all products

g_{0} · e_{i_{0} i_{1}} · g_{1} · e_{i_{1} i_{2}} · ··· · g_{n} · e_{i_{n}i_{0}}

where i_{0}, i_{1}, ..., i_{n}, i_{0} is an edge-path, g_{k} lies in Γ_{i_{k}} and e_{ji}=e_{ij}^{−1} if i $\rightarrow$ j.

=== Developable complexes ===
A simplicial proper action of a discrete group Γ on a simplicial complex X with finite quotient is said to be regular if it satisfies one of the following equivalent conditions:

- X admits a finite subcomplex as fundamental domain;
- the quotient Y = X/Γ has a natural simplicial structure;
- the quotient simplicial structure on orbit-representatives of vertices is consistent;
- if (v_{0}, ..., v_{k}) and (g_{0}·v_{0}, ..., g_{k}·v_{k}) are simplices, then g·v_{i} = g_{i}·v_{i} for some g in Γ.

The fundamental domain and quotient Y = X / Γ can naturally be identified as simplicial complexes in this case, given by the stabilisers of the simplices in the fundamental domain. A complex of groups Y is said to be developable if it arises in this way.

- A complex of groups is developable if and only if the homomorphisms of Γ_{σ} into the edge-path group are injective.
- A complex of groups is developable if and only if for each simplex σ there is an injective homomorphism θ_{σ} from Γ_{σ} into a fixed discrete group Γ such that θ_{τ}·f_{στ} = θ_{σ}. In this case the simplicial complex X is canonically defined: it has k-simplices (σ, xΓ_{σ}) where σ is a k-simplex of Y and x runs over Γ / Γ_{σ}. Consistency can be checked using the fact that the restriction of the complex of groups to a simplex is equivalent to one with trivial cocycle g_{ρστ}.

The action of Γ on the barycentric subdivision X ' of X always satisfies the following condition, weaker than regularity:

- whenever σ and g·σ are subsimplices of some simplex τ, they are equal, i.e. σ = g·σ

Indeed, simplices in X ' correspond to chains of simplices in X, so that a subsimplices, given by subchains of simplices, is uniquely determined by the sizes of the simplices in the subchain. When an action satisfies this condition, then g necessarily fixes all the vertices of σ. A straightforward inductive argument shows that such an action becomes regular on the barycentric subdivision; in particular

- the action on the second barycentric subdivision X" is regular;
- Γ is naturally isomorphic to the edge-path group defined using edge-paths and vertex stabilisers for the barycentric subdivision of the fundamental domain in X".

There is in fact no need to pass to a third barycentric subdivision: as Haefliger observes using the language of category theory, in this case the 3-skeleton of the fundamental domain of X" already carries all the necessary data – including transition elements for triangles – to define an edge-path group isomorphic to Γ.

In two dimensions this is particularly simple to describe. The fundamental domain of X" has the same structure as the barycentric subdivision Y ' of a complex of groups Y, namely:

- a finite 2-dimensional simplicial complex Z;
- an orientation for all edges i $\rightarrow$ j;
- if i $\rightarrow$ j and j $\rightarrow$ k are edges, then i $\rightarrow$ k is an edge and (i, j, k) is a triangle;
- finite groups attached to vertices, inclusions to edges and transition elements, describing compatibility, to triangles.

An edge-path group can then be defined. A similar structure is inherited by the barycentric subdivision Z ' and its edge-path group is isomorphic to that of Z.

== Orbihedra ==
If a countable discrete group acts by a regular simplicial proper action on a simplicial complex, the quotient can be given not only the structure of a complex of groups, but also that of an orbispace. This leads more generally to the definition of "orbihedron", the simplicial analogue of an orbifold.

=== Definition ===
Let X be a finite simplicial complex with barycentric subdivision X '. An orbihedron structure consists of:

- for each vertex i of X ', a simplicial complex L_{i}' endowed with a rigid simplicial action of a finite group Γ_{i}.
- a simplicial map φ_{i} of L_{i}' onto the link L_{i} of i in X ', identifying the quotient L_{i}' / Γ_{i} with L_{i}.

This action of Γ_{i} on L_{i}' extends to a simplicial action on the simplicial cone C_{i} over L_{i}' (the simplicial join of i and L_{i}'), fixing the centre i of the cone. The map φ_{i} extends to a simplicial map of C_{i} onto the star St(i) of i, carrying the centre onto i; thus φ_{i} identifies C_{i} / Γ_{i}, the quotient of the star of i in C_{i}, with St(i) and gives an orbihedron chart at i.

- for each directed edge i $\rightarrow$ j of X ', an injective homomorphism f_{ij} of Γ_{i} into Γ_{j}.
- for each directed edge i $\rightarrow$ j, a Γ_{i} equivariant simplicial gluing map ψ_{ij} of C_{i} into C_{j}.
- the gluing maps are compatible with the charts, i.e. φ_{j}·ψ_{ij} = φ_{i}.
- the gluing maps are unique up to composition with group elements, i.e. any other possible gluing map from V_{i} to V_{j} has the form g·ψ_{ij} for a unique g in Γ_{j}.

If i$\rightarrow$ j $\rightarrow$ k, then there is a unique transition element g_{ijk} in Γ_{k} such that

g_{ijk}·ψ_{ik} = ψ_{jk}·ψ_{ij}

These transition elements satisfy

(Ad g_{ijk})·f_{ik} = f_{jk}·f_{ij}

as well as the cocycle relation

ψ_{km}(g_{ijk})·g_{ikm} = g_{ijm}·g_{jkm}.

=== Main properties ===
- The group theoretic data of an orbihedron gives a complex of groups on X, because the vertices i of the barycentric subdivision X ' correspond to the simplices in X.
- Every complex of groups on X is associated with an essentially unique orbihedron structure on X. This key fact follows by noting that the star and link of a vertex i of X ', corresponding to a simplex σ of X, have natural decompositions: the star is isomorphic to the abstract simplicial complex given by the join of σ and the barycentric subdivision σ' of σ; and the link is isomorphic to join of the link of σ in X and the link of the barycentre of σ in σ'. Restricting the complex of groups to the link of σ in X, all the groups Γ_{τ} come with injective homomorphisms into Γ_{σ}. Since the link of i in X ' is canonically covered by a simplicial complex on which Γ_{σ} acts, this defines an orbihedron structure on X.
- The orbihedron fundamental group is (tautologically) just the edge-path group of the associated complex of groups.
- Every orbihedron is also naturally an orbispace: indeed in the geometric realization of the simplicial complex, orbispace charts can be defined using the interiors of stars.
- The orbihedron fundamental group can be naturally identified with the orbispace fundamental group of the associated orbispace. This follows by applying the simplicial approximation theorem to segments of an orbispace path lying in an orbispace chart: it is a straightforward variant of the classical proof that the fundamental group of a polyhedron can be identified with its edge-path group.
- The orbispace associated to an orbihedron has a canonical metric structure, coming locally from the length metric in the standard geometric realization in Euclidean space, with vertices mapped to an orthonormal basis. Other metric structures are also used, involving length metrics obtained by realizing the simplices in hyperbolic space, with simplices identified isometrically along common boundaries.
- The orbispace associated to an orbihedron is non-positively curved if and only if the link in each orbihedron chart has girth greater than or equal to 6, i.e. any closed circuit in the link has length at least 6. This condition, well known from the theory of Hadamard spaces, depends only on the underlying complex of groups.
- When the universal covering orbihedron is non-positively curved the fundamental group is infinite and is generated by isomorphic copies of the isotropy groups. This follows from the corresponding result for orbispaces.

== Triangles of groups ==
Historically one of the most important applications of orbifolds in geometric group theory has been to triangles of groups. This is the simplest 2-dimensional example generalising the 1-dimensional "interval of groups" discussed in Serre's lectures on trees, where amalgamated free products are studied in terms of actions on trees. Such triangles of groups arise any time a discrete group acts simply transitively on the triangles in the affine Bruhat–Tits building for SL_{3}(Q_{p}); in 1979 Mumford discovered the first example for p = 2 (see below) as a step in producing an algebraic surface not isomorphic to projective space, but having the same Betti numbers. Triangles of groups were worked out in detail by Gersten and Stallings, while the more general case of complexes of groups, described above, was developed independently by Haefliger. The underlying geometric method of analysing finitely presented groups in terms of metric spaces of non-positive curvature is due to Gromov. In this context triangles of groups correspond to non-positively curved 2-dimensional simplicial complexes with the regular action of a group, transitive on triangles.

A triangle of groups is a simple complex of groups consisting of a triangle with vertices A, B, C. There are groups

- Γ_{A}, Γ_{B}, Γ_{C} at each vertex
- Γ_{BC}, Γ_{CA}, Γ_{AB} for each edge
- Γ_{ABC} for the triangle itself.

There are injective homomorphisms of Γ_{ABC} into all the other groups and of an edge group Γ_{XY} into Γ_{X} and Γ_{Y}. The three ways of mapping Γ_{ABC} into a vertex group all agree. (Often Γ_{ABC} is the trivial group.) The Euclidean metric structure on the corresponding orbispace is non-positively curved if and only if the link of each of the vertices in the orbihedron chart has girth at least 6.

This girth at each vertex is always even and, as observed by Stallings, can be described at a vertex A, say, as the length of the smallest word in the kernel of the natural homomorphism into Γ_{A} of the amalgamated free product over Γ_{ABC} of the edge groups Γ_{AB} and Γ_{AC}:

$$\Gamma_{AB} \star_{\,\Gamma_{ABC}} \Gamma_{AC} \rightarrow \Gamma_A.$$

The result using the Euclidean metric structure is not optimal. Angles α, β, γ at the vertices A, B and C were defined by Stallings as 2π divided by the girth. In the Euclidean case α, β, γ ≤ π/3. However, if it is only required that α + β + γ ≤ π, it is possible to identify the triangle with the corresponding geodesic triangle in the hyperbolic plane with the Poincaré metric (or the Euclidean plane if equality holds). It is a classical result from hyperbolic geometry that the hyperbolic medians intersect in the hyperbolic barycentre, just as in the familiar Euclidean case. The barycentric subdivision and metric from this model yield a non-positively curved metric structure on the corresponding orbispace. Thus, if α+β+γ≤π,

- the orbispace of the triangle of groups is developable;
- the corresponding edge-path group, which can also be described as the colimit of the triangle of groups, is infinite;
- the homomorphisms of the vertex groups into the edge-path group are injections.

=== Mumford's example ===
The Fano plane

Let α = $\sqrt{-7}$ be given by the binomial expansion of (1 − 8)^{1/2} in Q_{2} and set K = Q(α) $\subset$ Q_{2}. Let

ζ = exp 2πi/7

λ = (α − 1)/2 = ζ + ζ^{2} + ζ^{4}

μ = λ/λ*.

Let E = Q(ζ), a 3-dimensional vector space over K with basis 1, ζ, and ζ^{2}. Define K-linear operators on E as follows:

- σ is the generator of the Galois group of E over K, an element of order 3 given by σ(ζ) = ζ^{2}
- τ is the operator of multiplication by ζ on E, an element of order 7
- ρ is the operator given by ρ(ζ) = 1, ρ(ζ^{2}) = ζ and ρ(1) = μ·ζ^{2}, so that ρ^{3} is scalar multiplication by μ.

The elements ρ, σ, and τ generate a discrete subgroup of GL_{3}(K) which acts properly on the affine Bruhat–Tits building corresponding to SL_{3}(Q_{2}). This group acts transitively on all vertices, edges and triangles in the building. Let

σ_{1} = σ, σ_{2} = ρσρ^{−1}, σ_{3} = ρ^{2}σρ^{−2}.

Then

- σ_{1}, σ_{2} and σ_{3} generate a subgroup Γ of SL_{3}(K).
- Γ is the smallest subgroup generated by σ and τ, invariant under conjugation by ρ.
- Γ acts simply transitively on the triangles in the building.
- There is a triangle Δ such that the stabiliser of its edges are the subgroups of order 3 generated by the σ_{i}'s.
- The stabiliser of a vertices of Δ is the Frobenius group of order 21 generated by the two order 3 elements stabilising the edges meeting at the vertex.
- The stabiliser of Δ is trivial.

The elements σ and τ generate the stabiliser of a vertex. The link of this vertex can be identified with the spherical building of SL_{3}(F_{2}) and the stabiliser can be identified with the collineation group of the Fano plane generated by a 3-fold symmetry σ fixing a point and a cyclic permutation τ of all 7 points, satisfying στ = τ^{2}σ. Identifying F_{8}* with the Fano plane, σ can be taken to be the restriction of the Frobenius automorphism σ(x) = x^{22} of F_{8} and τ to be multiplication by any element not in the prime field F_{2}, i.e. an order 7 generator of the cyclic multiplicative group of F_{8}. This Frobenius group acts simply transitively on the 21 flags in the Fano plane, i.e. lines with marked points. The formulas for σ and τ on E thus "lift" the formulas on F_{8}.

Mumford also obtains an action simply transitive on the vertices of the building by passing to a subgroup of Γ_{1} = <ρ, σ, τ, −I>. The group Γ_{1} preserves the Q(α)-valued Hermitian form

f(x,y) = xy* + σ(xy*) + σ^{2}(xy*)

on Q(ζ) and can be identified with U_{3}(f) $\cap$ GL_{3}(S) where S = Z[α,1/2]. Since S/(α) = F_{7}, there is a homomorphism of the group Γ_{1} into GL_{3}(F_{7}). This action leaves invariant a 2-dimensional subspace in F_{7}^{3} and hence gives rise to a homomorphism Ψ of Γ_{1} into SL_{2}(F_{7}), a group of order 16·3·7. On the other hand, the stabiliser of a vertex is a subgroup of order 21 and Ψ is injective on this subgroup. Thus if the congruence subgroup Γ_{0} is defined as the inverse image under Ψ of the 2-Sylow subgroup of SL_{2}(F_{7}), the action of Γ_{0} on vertices must be simply transitive.

=== Generalizations ===
Other examples of triangles or 2-dimensional complexes of groups can be constructed by variations of the above example.

Cartwright et al. consider actions on buildings that are simply transitive on vertices. Each such action produces a bijection (or modified duality) between the points x and lines x* in the flag complex of a finite projective plane and a collection of oriented triangles of points (x,y,z), invariant under cyclic permutation, such that x lies on z*, y lies on x* and z lies on y* and any two points uniquely determine the third. The groups produced have generators x, labelled by points, and relations xyz = 1 for each triangle. Generically this construction will not correspond to an action on a classical affine building.

More generally, as shown by Ballmann and Brin, similar algebraic data encodes all actions that are simply transitively on the vertices of a non-positively curved 2-dimensional simplicial complex, provided the link of each vertex has girth at least 6. This data consists of:

- a generating set S containing inverses, but not the identity;
- a set of relations g h k = 1, invariant under cyclic permutation.

The elements g in S label the vertices g·v in the link of a fixed vertex v; and the relations correspond to edges (g^{−1}·v, h·v) in that link. The graph with vertices S and edges (g, h), for g^{−1}h in S, must have girth at least 6. The original simplicial complex can be reconstructed using complexes of groups and the second barycentric subdivision.

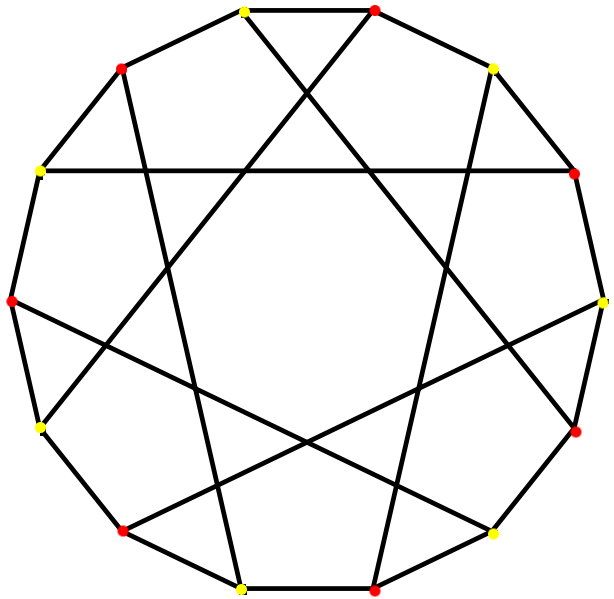
The bipartite Heawood graph

Further examples of non-positively curved 2-dimensional complexes of groups have been constructed by Swiatkowski based on actions simply transitive on oriented edges and inducing a 3-fold symmetry on each triangle; in this case too the complex of groups is obtained from the regular action on the second barycentric subdivision. The simplest example, discovered earlier with Ballmann, starts from a finite group H with a symmetric set of generators S, not containing the identity, such that the corresponding Cayley graph has girth at least 6. The associated group is generated by H and an involution τ subject to (τg)^{3} = 1 for each g in S.

In fact, if Γ acts in this way, fixing an edge (v, w), there is an involution τ interchanging v and w. The link of v is made up of vertices g·w for g in a symmetric subset S of H = Γ_{v}, generating H if the link is connected. The assumption on triangles implies that

τ·(g·w) = g^{−1}·w

for g in S. Thus, if σ = τg and u = g^{−1}·w, then

σ(v) = w, σ(w) = u, σ(u) = w.

By simple transitivity on the triangle (v, w, u), it follows that σ^{3} = 1.

The second barycentric subdivision gives a complex of groups consisting of singletons or pairs of barycentrically subdivided triangles joined along their large sides: these pairs are indexed by the quotient space S/~ obtained by identifying inverses in S. The single or "coupled" triangles are in turn joined along one common "spine". All stabilisers of simplices are trivial except for the two vertices at the ends of the spine, with stabilisers H and <τ>, and the remaining vertices of the large triangles, with stabiliser generated by an appropriate σ. Three of the smaller triangles in each large triangle contain transition elements.

When all the elements of S are involutions, none of the triangles need to be doubled. If H is taken to be the dihedral group D_{7} of order 14, generated by an involution a and an element b of order 7 such that

ab= b^{−1}a,

then H is generated by the 3 involutions a, ab and ab^{5}. The link of each vertex is given by the corresponding Cayley graph, so is just the bipartite Heawood graph, i.e. exactly the same as in the affine building for SL_{3}(Q_{2}). This link structure implies that the corresponding simplicial complex is necessarily a Euclidean building. At present, however, it seems to be unknown whether any of these types of action can in fact be realised on a classical affine building: Mumford's group Γ_{1} (modulo scalars) is only simply transitive on edges, not on oriented edges.

== Two-dimensional orbifolds ==
Two-dimensional orbifolds have the following three types of singular points:

- A boundary point
- An elliptic point or gyration point of order n, such as the origin of R^{2} quotiented out by a cyclic group of order n of rotations.
- A corner reflector of order n: the origin of R^{2} quotiented out by a dihedral group of order 2n.

A compact 2-dimensional orbifold has an Euler characteristic $\chi$ given by

$$\chi= \chi(X_0) - \sum_{i}(1 - 1/n_i)/2 - \sum_{i} (1 - 1/m_i )$$,

where $\chi(X_0)$ is the Euler characteristic of the underlying topological manifold $X_0$, and $n_i$ are the orders of the corner reflectors, and $m_i$ are the orders of the elliptic points.

A 2-dimensional compact connected orbifold has a hyperbolic structure if its Euler characteristic is less than 0, a Euclidean structure if it is 0, and if its Euler characteristic is positive it is either bad or has an elliptic structure (an orbifold is called bad if it does not have a manifold as a covering space). In other words, its universal covering space has a hyperbolic, Euclidean, or spherical structure.

The compact 2-dimensional connected orbifolds that are not hyperbolic are listed in the table below. The 17 parabolic orbifolds are the quotients of the plane by the 17 wallpaper groups.

Type	Euler characteristic	Underlying 2-manifold	Orders of elliptic points	Orders of corner reflectors
Bad	1 + 1/n	Sphere	n > 1	
Bad	1/m + 1/n	Sphere	n > m > 1	
Bad	1/2 + 1/2n	Disk		n > 1
Bad	1/2m + 1/2n	Disk		n > m > 1
Elliptic	2	Sphere		
Elliptic	2/n	Sphere	n, n	
Elliptic	1/n	Sphere	2, 2, n	
Elliptic	1/6	Sphere	2, 3, 3	
Elliptic	1/12	Sphere	2, 3, 4	
Elliptic	1/30	Sphere	2, 3, 5	
Elliptic	1	Disc		
Elliptic	1/n	Disc		n, n
Elliptic	1/2n	Disc		2, 2, n
Elliptic	1/12	Disc		2, 3, 3
Elliptic	1/24	Disc		2, 3, 4
Elliptic	1/60	Disc		2, 3, 5
Elliptic	1/n	Disc	n	
Elliptic	1/2n	Disc	2	n
Elliptic	1/12	Disc	3	2
Elliptic	1	Projective plane		
Elliptic	1/n	Projective plane	n	
Parabolic	0	Sphere	2, 3, 6	
Parabolic	0	Sphere	2, 4, 4	
Parabolic	0	Sphere	3, 3, 3	
Parabolic	0	Sphere	2, 2, 2, 2	
Parabolic	0	Disk		2, 3, 6
Parabolic	0	Disk		2, 4, 4
Parabolic	0	Disk		3, 3, 3
Parabolic	0	Disk		2, 2, 2, 2
Parabolic	0	Disk	2	2, 2
Parabolic	0	Disk	3	3
Parabolic	0	Disk	4	2
Parabolic	0	Disk	2, 2	
Parabolic	0	Projective plane	2, 2	
Parabolic	0	Torus		
Parabolic	0	Klein bottle		
Parabolic	0	Annulus		
Parabolic	0	Moebius band		

== 3-dimensional orbifolds ==
A 3-manifold is said to be small if it is closed, irreducible and does not contain any incompressible surfaces.

Orbifold Theorem. Let M be a small 3-manifold. Let φ be a non-trivial periodic orientation-preserving diffeomorphism of M. Then M admits a φ-invariant hyperbolic or Seifert fibered structure.

This theorem is a special case of Thurston's orbifold theorem, announced without proof in 1981; it forms part of his geometrization conjecture for 3-manifolds. In particular it implies that if X is a compact, connected, orientable, irreducible, atoroidal 3-orbifold with non-empty singular locus, then M has a geometric structure (in the sense of orbifolds). A complete proof of the theorem was published by Boileau, Leeb & Porti in 2005.

== Applications ==
=== Orbifolds in string theory ===
In string theory, the word "orbifold" has a slightly new meaning. For mathematicians, an orbifold is a generalization of the notion of manifold that allows the presence of the points whose neighborhood is diffeomorphic to a quotient of R^{n} by a finite group, i.e. R^{n}/Γ. In physics, the notion of an orbifold usually describes an object that can be globally written as an orbit space M/G where M is a manifold (or a theory), and G is a group of its isometries (or symmetries) — not necessarily all of them. In string theory, these symmetries do not have to have a geometric interpretation.

A quantum field theory defined on an orbifold becomes singular near the fixed points of G. However string theory requires us to add new parts of the closed string Hilbert space — namely the twisted sectors where the fields defined on the closed strings are periodic up to an action from G. Orbifolding is therefore a general procedure of string theory to derive a new string theory from an old string theory in which the elements of G have been identified with the identity. Such a procedure reduces the number of states because the states must be invariant under G, but it also increases the number of states because of the extra twisted sectors. The result is usually a perfectly smooth, new string theory.

D-branes propagating on the orbifolds are described, at low energies, by gauge theories defined by the quiver diagrams. Open strings attached to these D-branes have no twisted sector, and so the number of open string states is reduced by the orbifolding procedure.

More specifically, when the orbifold group G is a discrete subgroup of spacetime isometries, then if it has no fixed point, the result is usually a compact smooth space; the twisted sector consists of closed strings wound around the compact dimension, which are called winding states.

When the orbifold group G is a discrete subgroup of spacetime isometries, and it has fixed points, then these usually have conical singularities, because R^{n}/Z_{k} has such a singularity at the fixed point of Z_{k}. In string theory, gravitational singularities are usually a sign of extra degrees of freedom which are located at a locus point in spacetime. In the case of the orbifold these degrees of freedom are the twisted states, which are strings "stuck" at the fixed points. When the fields related with these twisted states acquire a non-zero vacuum expectation value, the singularity is deformed, i.e. the metric is changed and becomes regular at this point and around it. An example for a resulting geometry is the Eguchi–Hanson spacetime.

From the point of view of D-branes in the vicinity of the fixed points, the effective theory of the open strings attached to these D-branes is a supersymmetric field theory, whose space of vacua has a singular point, where additional massless degrees of freedom exist. The fields related with the closed string twisted sector couple to the open strings in such a way as to add a Fayet–Iliopoulos term to the supersymmetric field theory Lagrangian, so that when such a field acquires a non-zero vacuum expectation value, the Fayet–Iliopoulos term is non-zero, and thereby deforms the theory (i.e. changes it) so that the singularity no longer exists , .

==== Calabi–Yau manifolds ====
In superstring theory, the construction of realistic phenomenological models requires dimensional reduction because the strings naturally propagate in a 10-dimensional space whilst the observed dimension of space-time of the universe is 4. Formal constraints on the theories nevertheless place restrictions on the compactified space in which the extra "hidden" variables live: when looking for realistic 4-dimensional models with supersymmetry, the auxiliary compactified space must be a 6-dimensional Calabi–Yau manifold.

There are a large number of possible Calabi–Yau manifolds (tens of thousands), hence the use of the term "landscape" in the current theoretical physics literature to describe the baffling choice. The general study of Calabi–Yau manifolds is mathematically complex and for a long time examples have been hard to construct explicitly. Orbifolds have therefore proved very useful since they automatically satisfy the constraints imposed by supersymmetry. They provide degenerate examples of Calabi–Yau manifolds due to their singular points, but this is completely acceptable from the point of view of theoretical physics. Such orbifolds are called "supersymmetric": they are technically easier to study than general Calabi–Yau manifolds. It is very often possible to associate a continuous family of non-singular Calabi–Yau manifolds to a singular supersymmetric orbifold. In 4 dimensions this can be illustrated using complex K3 surfaces:

- Every K3 surface admits 16 cycles of dimension 2 that are topologically equivalent to usual 2-spheres. Making the surface of these spheres tend to zero, the K3 surface develops 16 singularities. This limit represents a point on the boundary of the moduli space of K3 surfaces and corresponds to the orbifold $T^4/\mathbb{Z}_2\,$ obtained by taking the quotient of the torus by the symmetry of inversion.

The study of Calabi–Yau manifolds in string theory and the duality between different models of string theory (type IIA and IIB) led to the idea of mirror symmetry in 1988. The role of orbifolds was first pointed out by Dixon, Harvey, Vafa and Witten around the same time.

=== Music theory ===
Beyond their manifold and various applications in mathematics and physics, orbifolds have been applied to music theory at least as early as 1985 in the work of Guerino Mazzola and later by Dmitri Tymoczko and collaborators. One of the papers of Tymoczko was the first music theory paper published by the journal Science. Mazzola and Tymoczko have participated in debate regarding their theories documented in a series of commentaries available at their respective web sites.

Animated slices of the three-dimensional orbifold $T^3 / S_3$. Slices of cubes standing on end (with their long diagonals perpendicular to the plane of the image) form colored Voronoi regions (colored by chord type) which represent the three-note chords at their centers, with augmented triads at the very center, surrounded by major and minor triads (lime green and navy blue). The white regions are degenerate trichords (one-note repeated three times), with the three lines (representing two note chords) connecting their centers forming the walls of the twisted triangular prism, 2D planes perpendicular to plane of the image acting as mirrors.

Tymoczko models musical chords consisting of n notes, which are not necessarily distinct, as points in the orbifold $T^n/S_n$ – the space of n unordered points (not necessarily distinct) in the circle, realized as the quotient of the n-torus $T^n$ (the space of n ordered points on the circle) by the symmetric group $S_n$ (corresponding from moving from an ordered set to an unordered set).

Musically, this is explained as follows:

- Musical tones depend on the frequency (pitch) of their fundamental, and thus are parametrized by the positive real numbers, R^{+}.
- Musical tones that differ by an octave (a doubling of frequency) are considered the same tone – this corresponds to taking the logarithm base 2 of frequencies (yielding the real numbers, as $\mathbf{R} = \log_2 \mathbf{R}^+$), then quotienting by the integers (corresponding to differing by some number of octaves), yielding a circle (as $S^1 = \mathbf{R}/\mathbf{Z}$).
- Chords correspond to multiple tones without respect to order – thus t notes (with order) correspond to t ordered points on the circle, or equivalently a single point on the t-torus $T^t := S^1 \times \cdots \times S^1,$ and omitting order corresponds to taking the quotient by $S_t,$ yielding an orbifold.

For dyads (two tones), this yields the closed Möbius strip; for triads (three tones), this yields an orbifold that can be described as a triangular prism with the top and bottom triangular faces identified with a 120° twist (a 1/3 twist) – equivalently, as a solid torus in 3 dimensions with a cross-section an equilateral triangle and such a twist.

The resulting orbifold is naturally stratified by repeated tones (properly, by integer partitions of t) – the open set consists of distinct tones (the partition $t = 1 + 1 + \cdots + 1$), while there is a 1-dimensional singular set consisting of all tones being the same (the partition $t = t$), which topologically is a circle, and various intermediate partitions. There is also a notable circle which runs through the center of the open set consisting of equally spaced points. In the case of triads, the three side faces of the prism correspond to two tones being the same and the third different (the partition $3 = 2 + 1$), while the three edges of the prism correspond to the 1-dimensional singular set. The top and bottom faces are part of the open set, and only appear because the orbifold has been cut – if viewed as a triangular torus with a twist, these artifacts disappear.

Tymoczko argues that chords close to the center (with tones equally or almost equally spaced) form the basis of much of traditional Western harmony, and that visualizing them in this way assists in analysis. There are 4 chords on the center (equally spaced under equal temperament – spacing of 4/4/4 between tones), corresponding to the augmented triads (thought of as musical sets) C♯FA, DF♯A♯, D♯GB, and EG♯C (then they cycle: FAC♯ = C♯FA), with the 12 major chords and 12 minor chords being the points next to but not on the center – almost evenly spaced but not quite. Major chords correspond to 4/3/5 (or equivalently, 5/4/3) spacing, while minor chords correspond to 3/4/5 spacing. Key changes then correspond to movement between these points in the orbifold, with smoother changes effected by movement between nearby points.

== See also ==
- Branched covering
- Euler characteristic of an orbifold
- Geometric quotient
- Kawasaki's Riemann–Roch formula
- Orbifold notation
- Orientifold
- Ring of modular forms
- Stack (mathematics)
