= Localized Chern class =

Concept in geometry

In algebraic geometry, a localized Chern class is a variant of a Chern class, that is defined for a chain complex of vector bundles as opposed to a single vector bundle. It was originally introduced in Fulton's Intersection theory, as an algebraic counterpart of the similar construction in algebraic topology. The notion is used in particular in the Riemann–Roch-type theorem.

S. Bloch later generalized the notion in the context of arithmetic schemes (schemes over a Dedekind domain) for the purpose of giving #Bloch's conductor formula that computes the non-constancy of Euler characteristic of a degenerating family of algebraic varieties (in the mixed characteristic case).

== Definitions ==
Let Y be a pure-dimensional regular scheme of finite type over a field or discrete valuation ring and X a closed subscheme. Let $E_{\bullet}$ denote a complex of vector bundles on Y

$$0 = E_{n-1} \to E_n \to \dots \to E_m \to E_{m-1} = 0$$

that is exact on $Y - X$. The localized Chern class of this complex is a class in the bivariant Chow group of $X \subset Y$ defined as follows. Let $\xi_i$ denote the tautological bundle of the Grassmann bundle $G_i$ of rank $\operatorname{rk} E_i$ sub-bundles of $E_i \otimes E_{i-1}$. Let $\xi = \prod (-1)^i \operatorname{pr}_i^*(\xi_i)$. Then the i-th localized Chern class $c_{i, X}^Y(E_{\bullet})$ is defined by the formula:

$$c_{i, X}^Y(E_{\bullet}) \cap \alpha = \eta_*(c_i(\xi) \cap \gamma)$$

where $\eta: G_n \times_Y \dots \times_Y G_m \to X$ is the projection and $\gamma$ is a cycle obtained from $\alpha$ by the so-called graph construction.

== Example: localized Euler class ==
Let $f: X \to S$ be as in #Definitions. If S is smooth over a field, then the localized Chern class coincides with the class

$$(-1)^{\dim X} \mathbf{Z}(s_f)$$

where, roughly, $s_f$ is the section determined by the differential of f and (thus) $\mathbf{Z}(s_f)$ is the class of the singular locus of f.

Consider an infinite dimensional bundle E over an infinite dimensional manifold M with a section s with Fredholm derivative. In practice this situation occurs whenever we have system of PDEs which are elliptic when considered modulo some gauge group action. The zero set Z(s) is then the moduli space of solutions modulo gauge, and the index of the derivative is the virtual dimension. The localized Euler class of the pair (E,s) is a homology class with closed support on the zero set of the section. Its dimension is the index of the derivative. When the section is transversal, the class is just the fundamental class of the zero set with the proper orientation. The class is well behaved in one parameter families and therefore defines the “right” fundamental cycle even if the section is no longer transversal.

== Bloch's conductor formula ==
This formula enables us to compute the conductor that measures the wild ramification by using the sheaf of differential 1-forms. S. Bloch conjectures a formula for the Artin conductor of the ℓ-adic étale cohomology of a regular model of a variety over a local field and proves it for a curve. The deepest result about the Bloch conductor is its equality with the Artin conductor, defined in terms of the ℓ-adic cohomology of X, in certain cases.
