= Kawasaki's Riemann–Roch formula =

Computes the Euler characteristic of an orbifold

In differential geometry, Kawasaki's Riemann–Roch formula, introduced by Tetsuro Kawasaki, is the Riemann–Roch formula for orbifolds. It can compute the Euler characteristic of an orbifold.

Kawasaki's original proof made a use of the equivariant index theorem. Today, the formula is known to follow from the Riemann–Roch formula for quotient stacks.

== See also ==
- Riemann–Roch-type theorem
