= Dimitri Leemans =

Belgian mathematician (born 1972)

Dimitri Leemans (born 1972) is a Belgian mathematician born in Uccle.

== Biography ==
Leemans obtained his Licence en Sciences Mathématiques at the Université libre de Bruxelles in 1994 and his doctorate degree, under the supervision of Francis Buekenhout and Michel Dehon in 1998.

He is currently professor at the mathematics department of the Faculty of Sciences of the Université libre de Bruxelles. He lived five years in New Zealand from 2011 until 2016 where he worked for the University of Auckland as an associate professor. He returned to Belgium after experiencing problems with Immigration New Zealand because of his stepson's autism.

== Prizes and awards ==
- Agathon De Potter prize for the period 2000-2002 from the Academie Royale des Sciences de Belgique
- 2007 Annual Prize in Mathematics from the Academie Royale des Sciences de Belgique
- 2013-2016 Marsden grant from the Royal Society of New Zealand
- New Zealand Mathematical Society 2014 Research Award
- 2018 Francois Deruyts Prize in Geometry from the Academie Royale des Sciences de Belgique

== Research ==
Leemans's principal area of research is at the interface of algebra, computational mathematics, combinatorics and geometry. He has made major contributions in the study of regular and chiral polytopes whose automorphism groups are finite almost simple groups. He has published more than 90 papers in peer-reviewed scientific journals and two memoirs of the Academie Royale des Sciences de Belgique. He is the developer of the Magma (computer algebra system) package on incidence geometry and coset geometry since 1999.

== Major scientific publications ==
- Fernandes, Maria Elisa; Leemans, Dimitri (2011), "Polytopes of high rank for the symmetric groups", Advances in Mathematics, 228 (6): 3207–3222, doi:10.1016/j.aim.2011.08.006
- Cameron, Peter J.; Fernandes, Maria Elisa; Leemans, Dimitri; Mixer, Mark (2017), "Highest rank of a polytope for $A_n$", Proceedings of the London Mathematical Society, 115 (1): 135–176, arXiv:1605.09173, doi:10.1112/plms.12039, hdl:10023/10678, S2CID 55208000
- Leemans, Dimitri; Liebeck, Martin W. (2017), "Chiral polyhedra and finite simple groups", Bulletin of the London Mathematical Society, 49 (4): 581–592, arXiv:1603.07713, doi:10.1112/blms.12041, S2CID 119156295
- Fernandes, Maria Elisa; Leemans, Dimitri; Mixer, Mark (2018), "An extension of the classification of high rank regular polytopes", Transactions of the American Mathematical Society, 370 (12): 8833–8857, arXiv:1509.01032, doi:10.1090/tran/7425, S2CID 119141460
- Brooksbank, Peter A.; Leemans, Dimitri (2019), "Rank reduction of string C-group representations", Proceedings of the American Mathematical Society, 147 (12): 5421–5426, arXiv:1812.01055, doi:10.1090/proc/14666, S2CID 119623602
