= Euler calculus =

Euler calculus is a methodology from applied algebraic topology and integral geometry that integrates constructible functions and more recently definable functions by integrating with respect to the Euler characteristic as a finitely-additive measure. In the presence of a metric, it can be extended to continuous integrands via the Gauss–Bonnet theorem. It was introduced independently by Pierre Schapira and Oleg Viro in 1988, and is useful for enumeration problems in computational geometry and sensor networks.

== See also ==
- Topological data analysis
