= Francis Buekenhout =

Belgian mathematician

Francis Buekenhout (born 23 April 1937 in Ixelles near Brussels) is a Belgian mathematician who introduced Buekenhout geometries and the concept of quadratic sets.

== Career ==
Buekenhout studied at the University of Brussels under Jacques Tits and Paul Libois.

Together with his teacher Jacques Tits, he developed concepts with the diagram geometries, also called Buekenhout geometries or Buekenhout–Tits geometries. These largely disregard the concrete axiom systems of a projective or affine geometry and put these and many other incidence geometries into a common framework.

He worked at the ULB from 1960 to 1969 as an assistant to Libois. He was then appointed as extraordinary professor 1969 to 1998, and as ordinary professor from 1977 until his retirement in 2002. He has been a member of the Académie Royale des Sciences, Lettres et des Beaux-Arts de Belgique since May 2002, and in 1982 he won the Prix François Deruyts of this academy.

Buekenhout co-founded the Belgian Mathematics Olympics in 1976 and organized them from 1976 to 1987.

== Notable student ==
- Dimitri Leemans – Belgian mathematician
