= Francois Deruyts Prize =

The Francois Deruyts Prize, or Prix François Deruyts, is awarded every four years to recognize progress in synthetic or analytic superior geometry. It was established in 1902 by the Académie Royale de Belgique, Classe des Sciences, in memory of the Belgian mathematician François Deruyts, and carries a monetary award. Originally recipients had to be Belgian, but currently EU nationals are eligible.

== Recipients ==
The recipients of the Francois Deruyts Prize are:

- 1906: Modeste Stuyvaert
- 1910: Joseph Fairon
- 1914: Lucien Godeaux
- 1918: No award
- 1926: No award
- 1930: Roland Deaux
- 1934: Augustin Delgleize
- 1938: Pol Burniat
- 1938: Octave Rozet
- 1942: Pierre Defrise
- 1946: François Jongmans
- 1946: Louis Nollet
- 1950: Léon-Élie Derwidué
- 1954: Guy Hirsch
- 1958: Fernand Backes
- 1962: Paul Dedecker
- 1962: Jacques Tits
- 1966: No award
- 1970: J.A. Thas
- 1974: Pierre Deligne
- 1978: Michel Cahen
- 1982: Francis Buekenhout
- 1986: Pierre Lecomte
- 1990: Luc Haine
- 1994: Luc Lemaire
- 1998: Simone Gutt
- 2002: Yves Félix
- 2006: Frédéric Bourgeois
- 2010: Lorenz Johannes Schwachhöfer
- 2014: Pascal Lambrechts
- 2018: Dimitri Leemans
- 2022: Eva Miranda

== See also ==
- List of mathematics awards
