= Gyration =

Rotation in a discrete subgroup of symmetries of the Euclidean plane

In geometry, a gyration is a rotation in a discrete subgroup of symmetries of the Euclidean plane such that the subgroup does not also contain a reflection symmetry whose axis passes through the center of rotational symmetry. In the orbifold corresponding to the subgroup, a gyration corresponds to a rotation point that does not lie on a mirror, called a gyration point.

For example, having a sphere rotating about any point that is not the center of the sphere, the sphere is gyrating. If it was rotating about its center, the rotation would be symmetrical and it would not be considered gyration.
