= Eva Miranda =

Spanish mathematician (born 1973)

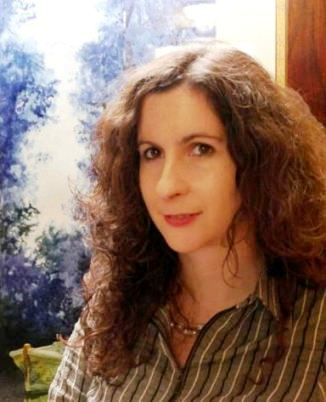
- Education: Universidad de Barcelona
- Awards: ICREA Acadèmia Award (2016, 2021); Chair of Excellence from Fondation sciences mathématiques de Paris (2017); Alexander von Humboldt Foundation Friedrich Wilhelm Bessel-Forschungspreis (2022); Francois Deruyts Prize (2022); Gauss Professorship (2025)
- Scientific career
- Fields: Mathematics
- Workplaces: Universitat Politècnica de Catalunya
- Thesis: On symplectic linearization of singular lagrangian foliations (2003)
- Doctoral advisor: Carlos Currás Bosch
- Doctoral students: Anna Kiesenhofer
- Website: https://mat-web.upc.edu/people/eva.miranda/nova

Eva Miranda Galcerán is a Spanish mathematician specializing in geometry and dynamical systems, especially in symplectic geometry.

== Education and career ==
Miranda earned a bachelor's degree in algebra and geometry from the University of Barcelona in 1999. She completed her Ph.D. at the same university in 2003. Her dissertation, On symplectic linearization of singular Lagrangian foliations, was supervised by Carlos Currás Bosch.

She was an assistant professor at the University of Barcelona from 2001 to 2006, and a Marie Curie postdoctoral researcher at the University of Toulouse from 2004 to 2007. From 2007 to 2009 she was Juan de la Cierva Researcher at the Autonomous University of Barcelona, and in 2009 she joined the mathematics department of the Polytechnic University of Catalonia. Since 2016 she has headed the Laboratory of Geometry and Dynamical Systems at the Polytechnic University. She became Full Professor at UPC in 2018.

Miranda was elected a corresponding member of the Royal Academy of Exact, Physical and Natural Sciences in 2026.

== Research ==
Miranda's research lies at the interface of geometry and dynamical systems, with recent applications to the mathematical aspects of computer science. She is known for her pioneering contributions to singular symplectic geometry. Her research includes work with Victor Guillemin on the mathematics underlying the three-body problem in celestial mechanics.

With Daniel Peralta-Salas and collaborators, she showed the existence of undecidable fluid paths, linking computer science, differential geometry, and fluid dynamics.

In 2025 she showed, together with Isaac Ramos, that 2D billiards with one ball can be Turing complete, solving an open problem posed by Cristopher Moore.

== Recognition ==
Miranda won the Acadèmia Award of the Catalan Institution for Research and Advanced Studies (ICREA) in 2016 and became ICREA Acadèmia Professor at the Polytechnic University of Catalonia in 2017. In 2021 she received the same award again, becoming the first mathematician in Catalonia to be awarded an ICREA Acadèmia prize twice.

In 2017, Miranda became the first Spanish mathematician and the second woman (after Hélène Esnault) to win a Chair of Excellence from the Fondation sciences mathématiques de Paris.

In July 2021 she was an invited speaker to the 8th European Congress of Mathematics.

Miranda is one of the scientists featured in the Casio Women do Science collection.

Miranda has also been distinguished with a Friedrich Wilhelm Bessel Research Award by the Alexander von Humboldt Foundation in 2022. In December 2022 she has been awarded the François Deruyts Prize by the Académie Royale de Belgique. Miranda was awarded in July 2026 with the inaugural Agnes Szantó Medal by the FoCM society for shaping, leading and serving the community at the interface of geometry, dynamics and computation. This medal will be awarded every three years.

She is the 2023 London Mathematical Society Hardy lecturer. In 2025 she has been named Gauss Professor by the Niedersächsische Akademie der Wissenschaften zu Göttingen. In 2025 she has also been named Nachdiplom lecturer by the ETHZ in Zurich.
