= Simone Gutt =

Belgian mathematician

Simone Gutt (born 1956) is a Belgian mathematician specializing in differential geometry. She is a professor of mathematics at the Université libre de Bruxelles.

== Education and career ==
Gutt was born on 13 July 1956 in Uccle, near Brussels. She completed her doctorate in 1980 at the Université libre de Bruxelles; her dissertation, Déformations formelles de l'algèbre des fonctions différentiables sur une variété symplectique, was jointly supervised by Michel Cahen and Moshé Flato.

She was a researcher for the National Fund for Scientific Research from 1981 until 1991, and became a professor at the Université libre de Bruxelles in 1992.

== Recognition ==
Gutt was the 1998 winner of the quadrennial Francois Deruyts Prize in geometry of the Royal Academies for Science and the Arts of Belgium. She was elected to the Royal Academy of Science, Letters and Fine Arts of Belgium in 2004.
