= Coxeter complex =

Simplicial complex

In mathematics, the Coxeter complex, named after H. S. M. Coxeter, is a geometrical structure (a simplicial complex) associated to a Coxeter group. Coxeter complexes are the basic objects that allow the construction of buildings; they form the apartments of a building.

== Construction ==
=== The canonical linear representation ===
The first ingredient in the construction of the Coxeter complex associated to a Coxeter system $(W,S)$ is a certain representation of $W$, called the canonical representation of $W$.

Let $(W,S)$ be a Coxeter system with Coxeter matrix $M = (m(s,t))_{s,t \in S}$. The canonical representation is given by a vector space $V$ with basis of formal symbols $(e_s)_{s \in S}$, which is equipped with the symmetric bilinear form $B(e_s,e_t) = - \cos \left ( \frac{\pi}{m(s,t)} \right )$. In particular, $B(e_s,e_s)=1$. The action of $W$ on $V$ is then given by $s(v) = v - 2 B(e_s,v)e_s$.

This representation has several foundational properties in the theory of Coxeter groups; for instance, $B$ is positive definite if and only if $W$ is finite. It is a faithful representation of $W$.

=== Chambers and the Tits cone ===
This representation describes $W$ as a reflection group, with the caveat that $B$ might not be positive definite. It becomes important then to distinguish the representation $V$ from its dual $V^*$. The vectors $e_s$ lie in $V$ and have corresponding dual vectors $e_s^\vee$ in $V^*$ given by
$$\langle e_s^\vee, v \rangle = 2 B(e_s,v),$$
where the angled brackets indicate the natural pairing between $V^*$ and $V$.

Now $W$ acts on $V^*$ and the action is given by
$$s(f) = f - \langle f, e_s \rangle e_s^\vee,$$
for $s \in S$ and any $f \in V^*$. Then $s$ is a reflection in the hyperplane $H_s = \{ f \in V^*: \langle f, e_s \rangle = 0 \}$. One has the fundamental chamber $\mathcal{C} = \{ f \in V^* : \langle f, e_s \rangle > 0 \ \forall s \in S \}$; this has faces the so-called walls, $H_s$. The other chambers can be obtained from $\mathcal{C}$ by translation: they are the $w\mathcal{C}$ for $w \in W$.

The Tits cone is $X = \bigcup_{w \in W} w \overline{\mathcal{C}}$. This need not be the whole of $V^*$. Of major importance is the fact that $X$ is convex. The closure $\overline{\mathcal{C}}$ of ${\mathcal{C}}$ is a fundamental domain for the action of $W$ on $X$.

=== The Coxeter complex ===
The Coxeter complex $\Sigma(W,S)$ of $W$ with respect to $S$ is $\Sigma(W,S) = (X \setminus \{ 0 \}) / \mathbb{R}_+$, where $\mathbb{R}_+$ is the multiplicative group of positive reals.

== Examples ==
=== Finite dihedral groups ===
The dihedral groups $D_n$ (of order 2n) are Coxeter groups, of corresponding type $\mathrm{I}_2(n)$. These have the presentation $\left \langle s, t \, \left | \, s^2, t^2, (st)^n \right \rangle \right .$.

The canonical linear representation of $\mathrm{I}_2(n)$ is the usual reflection representation of the dihedral group, as acting on an $n$-gon in the plane (so $V = \mathbb{R}^2$ in this case). For instance, in the case $n=3$ we get the Coxeter group of type $\mathrm{I}_2(3) = \mathrm{A}_2$, acting on an equilateral triangle in the plane. Each reflection $s$ has an associated hyperplane $H_s$ in the dual vector space (which can be canonically identified with the vector space itself using the bilinear form $B$, which is an inner product in this case as remarked above); these are the walls. They cut out chambers, as seen below:

The Coxeter complex is then the corresponding $2n$-gon, as in the image above. This is a simplicial complex of dimension 1, and it can be colored by cotype.

=== The infinite dihedral group ===
Another motivating example is the infinite dihedral group $D_{\infty}$. This can be seen as the group of symmetries of the real line that preserves the set of points with integer coordinates; it is generated by the reflections in $x= 0$ and $x = {1 \over 2}$. This group has the Coxeter presentation $\left \langle s, t \, \left | \, s^2, t^2 \right \rangle \right .$.

In this case, it is no longer possible to identify $V$ with its dual space $V^*$, as $B$ is degenerate. It is then better to work solely with $V^*$, which is where the hyperplanes are defined. This then gives the following picture:

In this case, the Tits cone is not the whole plane, but only the open upper half plane with the origin. Taking the quotient by the positive reals then yields another copy of the real line, with marked points at the integers. This is the Coxeter complex of the infinite dihedral group.

== Alternative construction of the Coxeter complex ==
Another description of the Coxeter complex uses standard cosets of the Coxeter group $W$. A standard coset is a coset of the form $w W_J$, where $W_J = \langle J \rangle$ for some proper subset $J$ of $S$. For instance, $W_S = W$ and $W_\emptyset = \{1\}$.

The Coxeter complex $\Sigma(W,S)$ is then the poset of standard cosets, ordered by reverse inclusion. This has a canonical structure of a simplicial complex, as do all posets that satisfy:

- Any two elements have a greatest lower bound.
- The poset of elements less than or equal to any given element is isomorphic to the poset of subsets of $\{1, 2, \ldots, n \}$ for some integer n.

== Properties ==
The Coxeter complex associated to $(W,S)$ has dimension $|S|-1$. It is homeomorphic to a $(|S|-1)$-sphere if W is finite and is contractible if W is infinite.

Every apartment of a spherical Tits building is a Coxeter complex.

== See also ==
- Buildings
- Weyl group
- Root system

== Sources ==
- Peter Abramenko and Kenneth S. Brown, Buildings, Theory and Applications. Springer, 2008.
