= Buekenhout geometry =

In mathematics, a Buekenhout geometry or diagram geometry is a generalization of projective spaces, Tits buildings, and several other geometric structures, introduced by Buekenhout (1979).

== Definition ==
A Buekenhout geometry consists of a set X whose elements are called "varieties", with a symmetric, reflexive relation on X called "incidence", together with a function τ called the "type map" from X to a set Δ whose elements are called "types" and whose size is called the "rank". Two distinct varieties of the same type cannot be incident.

A flag is a subset of X such that any two elements of the flag are incident. The Buekenhout geometry has to satisfy the following axiom:

- Every flag is contained in a flag with exactly one variety of each type.

Example: X is the linear subspaces of a projective space with two subspaces incident if one is contained in the other, Δ is the set of possible dimensions of linear subspaces, and the type map takes a linear subspace to its dimension. A flag in this case is a chain of subspaces, and each flag is contained in a so-called complete flag.

If F is a flag, the residue of F consists of all elements of X that are not in F but are incident with all elements of F. The residue of a flag forms a Buekenhout geometry in the obvious way, whose type are the types of X that are not types of F. A geometry is said to have some property residually if every residue of rank at least 2 has the property. In particular a geometry is called residually connected if every residue of rank at least 2 is connected (for the incidence relation).

== Diagrams ==
The diagram of a Buekenhout geometry has a point for each type, and two points x, y are connected with a line labeled to indicate what sort of geometry the rank 2 residues of type {x,y} have as follows.

- If the rank 2 residue is a digon, meaning any variety of type x is incident with every variety of type y, then the line from x to y is omitted. (This is the most common case.)
- If the rank 2 residue is a projective plane, then the line from x to y is not labelled. This is the next most common case.
- If the rank 2 residue is a more complicated geometry, the line is labelled by some symbol, which tends to vary from author to author.
