= Euler characteristic of an orbifold =

Concept in differential geometry

In differential geometry, the Euler characteristic of an orbifold, or orbifold Euler characteristic, is a generalization of the topological Euler characteristic that includes contributions coming from nontrivial automorphisms. In particular, unlike a topological Euler characteristic, it is not restricted to integer values and is in general a rational number. It is of interest in mathematical physics, specifically in string theory. Given a compact manifold $M$ quotiented by a finite group $G$, the Euler characteristic of $M/G$ is

$$\chi(M,G) = \frac{1}{|G|} \sum_{g_1 g_2 = g_2 g_1} \chi(M^{g_1, g_2}),$$

where $|G|$ is the order of the group $G$, the sum runs over all pairs of commuting elements of $G$, and $M^{g_1, g_2}$ is the space of simultaneous fixed points of $g_1$ and $g_2$. (The appearance of $\chi$ in the summation is the usual Euler characteristic.) If the action is free, the sum has only a single term, and so this expression reduces to the topological Euler characteristic of $M$ divided by $|G|$.

== See also ==
- Kawasaki's Riemann–Roch formula
