= Postnikov =

Postnikov (Russian: Постников) is a Russian masculine surname, its feminine counterpart is Postnikova. It may refer to

- Aleksandr Postnikov (born 1957), Russian military officer
- Alexey Georgiyevich Postnikov (1921–1995), Russian mathematician
- Alexey Vladimirovich Postnikov (born 1939), Russian historian
- Filipp Postnikov (born 1989), Russian football midfielder
- Golnur Postnikova (born 1964), Russian alpine skier
- Mikhail Postnikov (1927–2004), Russian mathematician
  - Postnikov square
  - Postnikov system
- Pyotr Postnikov (1666–1703), Russian diplomat
- Stanislav Postnikov (1928–2012), Soviet military commander
- Vadim Postnikov, Russian rugby player
- Valery Postnikov (1945–2016), Russian ice hockey player and coach
- Viktor Postnikov (born 1992), Russian ice hockey defenceman
- Viktoria Postnikova (born 1944), Russian pianist
- Yevgeny Postnikov (born 1986), Russian football player
