= Structural stability =

Concept in mathematics

In mathematics, structural stability is a fundamental property of a dynamical system which means that the qualitative behavior of the trajectories is unaffected by small perturbations (to be exact C^{1}-small perturbations).

Examples of such qualitative properties are numbers of fixed points and periodic orbits (but not their periods). Unlike Lyapunov stability, which considers perturbations of initial conditions for a fixed system, structural stability deals with perturbations of the system itself. Variants of this notion apply to systems of ordinary differential equations, vector fields on smooth manifolds and flows generated by them, and diffeomorphisms.

Structurally stable systems were introduced by Aleksandr Andronov and Lev Pontryagin in 1937 under the name "systèmes grossiers", or 'rough systems. They announced a characterization of rough systems in the plane, the Andronov–Pontryagin criterion. In this case, structurally stable systems are typical, they form an open dense set in the space of all systems endowed with appropriate topology. In higher dimensions, this is no longer true, indicating that typical dynamics can be very complex (cf. strange attractor). An important class of structurally stable systems in arbitrary dimensions is given by Anosov diffeomorphisms and flows. During the late 1950s and the early 1960s, Maurício Peixoto and Marília Chaves Peixoto, motivated by the work of Andronov and Pontryagin, developed and proved Peixoto's theorem, the first global characterization of structural stability.

== Definition ==
Let G be an open domain in R^{n} with compact closure and smooth (n−1)-dimensional boundary. Consider the space X^{1}(G) consisting of restrictions to G of C^{1} vector fields on R^{n} that are transversal to the boundary of G and are inward oriented. This space is endowed with the C^{1} metric in the usual fashion. A vector field F ∈ X^{1}(G) is weakly structurally stable if for any sufficiently small perturbation F_{1}, the corresponding flows are topologically equivalent on G: there exists a homeomorphism h: G → G which transforms the oriented trajectories of F into the oriented trajectories of F_{1}. If, moreover, for any ε > 0 the homeomorphism h may be chosen to be C^{0} ε-close to the identity map when F_{1} belongs to a suitable neighborhood of F depending on ε, then F is called (strongly) structurally stable. These definitions extend straightforwardly to the case of dimensional compact smooth manifolds with boundary. Andronov and Pontryagin originally considered the strong property. Analogous definitions can be given for diffeomorphisms in place of vector fields and flows: in this setting, the homeomorphism h must be a topological conjugacy.

Topological equivalence is realized with a loss of smoothness: the map h cannot, in general, be a diffeomorphism. Moreover, although topological equivalence respects the oriented trajectories, unlike topological conjugacy, it is not time-compatible. Thus, the relevant notion of topological equivalence is a considerable weakening of the naïve C^{1} conjugacy of vector fields. Without these restrictions, no continuous time system with fixed points or periodic orbits could have been structurally stable. Weakly structurally stable systems form an open set in X^{1}(G), but it is unknown whether the same property holds in the strong case.

== Examples ==
Necessary and sufficient conditions for the structural stability of C^{1} vector fields on the unit disk D that are transversal to the boundary and on the two-sphere S^{2} have been determined in the foundational paper of Andronov and Pontryagin. According to the Andronov–Pontryagin criterion, such fields are structurally stable if and only if they have only finitely many singular points (equilibrium states) and periodic trajectories (limit cycles), which are all non-degenerate (hyperbolic), and do not have saddle-to-saddle connections. Furthermore, the non-wandering set of the system is precisely the union of singular points and periodic orbits. In particular, structurally stable vector fields in two dimensions cannot have homoclinic trajectories, which enormously complicate the dynamics, as discovered by Henri Poincaré.

Structural stability of non-singular smooth vector fields on the torus can be investigated using the theory developed by Poincaré and Arnaud Denjoy. Using the Poincaré recurrence map, the question is reduced to determining structural stability of diffeomorphisms of the circle. As a consequence of the Denjoy theorem, an orientation preserving C^{2} diffeomorphism ƒ of the circle is structurally stable if and only if its rotation number is rational, ρ(ƒ) = p/q, and the periodic trajectories, which all have period q, are non-degenerate: the Jacobian of ƒ^{q} at the periodic points is different from 1, see circle map.

Dmitri Anosov discovered that hyperbolic automorphisms of the torus, such as the Arnold's cat map, are structurally stable. He then generalized this statement to a wider class of systems, which have since been called Anosov diffeomorphisms and Anosov flows. One celebrated example of Anosov flow is given by the geodesic flow on a surface of constant negative curvature, cf Hadamard billiards.

== History and significance ==
Structural stability of the system provides a justification for applying the qualitative theory of dynamical systems to analysis of concrete physical systems. The idea of such qualitative analysis goes back to the work of Henri Poincaré on the three-body problem in celestial mechanics. Around the same time, Aleksandr Lyapunov rigorously investigated stability of small perturbations of an individual system. In practice, the evolution law of the system (i.e. the differential equations) is never known exactly, due to the presence of various small interactions. It is, therefore, crucial to know that basic features of the dynamics are the same for any small perturbation of the "model" system, whose evolution is governed by a certain known physical law. Qualitative analysis was further developed by George Birkhoff in the 1920s, but was first formalized with introduction of the concept of rough system by Andronov and Pontryagin in 1937. This was immediately applied to analysis of physical systems with oscillations by Andronov, Witt, and Khaikin. The term "structural stability" is due to Solomon Lefschetz, who oversaw translation of their monograph into English. Ideas of structural stability were taken up by Stephen Smale and his school in the 1960s in the context of hyperbolic dynamics. Earlier, Marston Morse and Hassler Whitney initiated and René Thom developed a parallel theory of stability for differentiable maps, which forms a key part of singularity theory. Thom envisaged applications of this theory to biological systems. Both Smale and Thom worked in direct contact with Maurício Peixoto, who developed Peixoto's theorem in the late 1950s.

When Smale started to develop the theory of hyperbolic dynamical systems, he hoped that structurally stable systems would be "typical". This would have been consistent with the situation in low dimensions: dimension two for flows and dimension one for diffeomorphisms. However, he soon found examples of vector fields on higher-dimensional manifolds that cannot be made structurally stable by an arbitrarily small perturbation (such examples have been later constructed on manifolds of dimension three). This means that in higher dimensions, structurally stable systems are not dense. In addition, a structurally stable system may have transversal homoclinic trajectories of hyperbolic saddle closed orbits and infinitely many periodic orbits, even though the phase space is compact. The closest higher-dimensional analogue of structurally stable systems considered by Andronov and Pontryagin is given by the Morse–Smale systems.

== See also ==
- Homeostasis
- Self-stabilization
- Superstabilization
- Stability theory
