= Adams resolution =

In mathematics, specifically algebraic topology, there is a resolution analogous to free resolutions of spectra yielding a tool for constructing the Adams spectral sequence. Essentially, the idea is to take a connective spectrum of finite type $X$ and iteratively resolve with other spectra that are in the homotopy kernel of a map resolving the cohomology classes in $H^*(X;\mathbb{Z}/p)$ using Eilenberg–MacLane spectra.

This construction can be generalized using a spectrum $E$, such as the Brown–Peterson spectrum $BP$, or the complex cobordism spectrum $MU$, and is used in the construction of the Adams–Novikov spectral sequence^{pg 49}.

== Construction ==
The mod $p$ Adams resolution $(X_s,g_s)$ for a spectrum $X$ is a certain "chain-complex" of spectra induced from recursively looking at the fibers of maps into generalized Eilenberg–Maclane spectra giving generators for the cohomology of resolved spectra^{pg 43}. By this, we start by considering the map

$$\begin{matrix}
X \\
\downarrow \\
K
\end{matrix}$$

where $K$ is an Eilenberg–Maclane spectrum representing the generators of $H^*(X)$, so it is of the form

$K = \bigvee_{k=1}^\infty \bigvee_{I_k} \Sigma^kH\mathbb{Z}/p$

where $I_k$ indexes a basis of $H^k(X)$, and the map comes from the properties of Eilenberg–Maclane spectra. Then, we can take the homotopy fiber of this map (which acts as a homotopy kernel) to get a space $X_1$. Note, we now set $X_0 = X$ and $K_0 = K$. Then, we can form a commutative diagram

$$\begin{matrix}
X_0 & \leftarrow & X_1 \\
\downarrow & & \\
K_0
\end{matrix}$$

where the horizontal map is the fiber map. Recursively iterating through this construction yields a commutative diagram

$$\begin{matrix}
X_0 & \leftarrow & X_1 & \leftarrow & X_2 & \leftarrow \cdots \\
\downarrow & & \downarrow & & \downarrow \\
K_0 & & K_1 & & K_2
\end{matrix}$$

giving the collection $(X_s,g_s)$. This means

$X_s = \text{Hofiber}(f_{s-1}:X_{s-1} \to K_{s-1})$

is the homotopy fiber of $f_{s-1}$ and $g_s:X_s \to X_{s-1}$ comes from the universal properties of the homotopy fiber.

=== Resolution of cohomology of a spectrum ===
Now, we can use the Adams resolution to construct a free $\mathcal{A}_p$-resolution of the cohomology $H^*(X)$ of a spectrum $X$. From the Adams resolution, there are short exact sequences

$0 \leftarrow H^*(X_s) \leftarrow H^*(K_s) \leftarrow H^*(\Sigma X_{s+1}) \leftarrow 0$

which can be strung together to form a long exact sequence

$0 \leftarrow H^*(X) \leftarrow H^*(K_0) \leftarrow H^*(\Sigma K_1) \leftarrow H^*(\Sigma^2 K_2) \leftarrow \cdots$

giving a free resolution of $H^*(X)$ as an $\mathcal{A}_p$-module.

== E_{*}-Adams resolution ==
Because there are technical difficulties with studying the cohomology ring $E^*(E)$ in general^{pg 280}, we restrict to the case of considering the homology coalgebra $E_*(E)$ (of co-operations). Note for the case $E = H\mathbb{F}_p$, $H\mathbb{F}_{p*}(H\mathbb{F}_p) =\mathcal{A}_*$ is the dual Steenrod algebra. Since $E_*(X)$ is an $E_*(E)$-comodule, we can form the bigraded group

$\text{Ext}_{E_*(E)}(E_*(\mathbb{S}), E_*(X))$

which contains the $E_2$-page of the Adams–Novikov spectral sequence for $X$ satisfying a list of technical conditions^{pg 50}. To get this page, we must construct the $E_*$-Adams resolution^{pg 49}, which is somewhat analogous to the cohomological resolution above. We say a diagram of the form

$$\begin{matrix}
X_0 & \xleftarrow{g_0} & X_1 & \xleftarrow{g_1} & X_2 & \leftarrow \cdots \\
\downarrow & & \downarrow & & \downarrow \\
K_0 & & K_1 & & K_2
\end{matrix}$$

where the vertical arrows $f_s: X_s \to K_s$ is an $E_*$-Adams resolution if

1. $X_{s+1} = \text{Hofiber}(f_s)$ is the homotopy fiber of $f_s$
2. $E \wedge X_s$ is a retract of $E\wedge K_s$, hence $E_*(f_s)$ is a monomorphism. By retract, we mean there is a map $h_s:E \wedge K_s \to E \wedge X_s$ such that $h_s(E\wedge f_s) = id_{E \wedge X_s}$
3. $K_s$ is a retract of $E \wedge K_s$
4. $\text{Ext}^{t,u}(E_*(\mathbb{S}), E_*(K_s)) = \pi_u(K_s)$ if $t = 0$, otherwise it is $0$

Although this seems like a long laundry list of properties, they are very important in the construction of the spectral sequence. In addition, the retract properties affect the structure of construction of the $E_*$-Adams resolution since we no longer need to take a wedge sum of spectra for every generator.

=== Construction for ring spectra ===
The construction of the $E_*$-Adams resolution is rather simple to state in comparison to the previous resolution for any associative, commutative, connective ring spectrum $E$ satisfying some additional hypotheses. These include $E_*(E)$ being flat over $\pi_*(E)$, $\mu_*$ on $\pi_0$ being an isomorphism, and $H_r(E; A)$ with $\mathbb{Z} \subset A \subset \mathbb{Q}$ being finitely generated for which the unique ring map

$\theta:\mathbb{Z} \to \pi_0(E)$

extends maximally. If we set

$K_s = E \wedge F_s$

and let

$f_s: X_s \to K_s$

be the canonical map, we can set

$X_{s+1} = \text{Hofiber}(f_s)$

Note that $E$ is a retract of $E \wedge E$ from its ring spectrum structure, hence $E \wedge X_s$ is a retract of $E \wedge K_s = E \wedge E \wedge X_s$, and similarly, $K_s$ is a retract of $E\wedge K_s$. In addition

$E_*(K_s) = E_*(E)\otimes_{\pi_*(E)}E_*(X_s)$

which gives the desired $\text{Ext}$ terms from the flatness.

==== Relation to cobar complex ====
It turns out the $E_1$-term of the associated Adams–Novikov spectral sequence is then cobar complex $C^*(E_*(X))$.

== See also ==
- Adams spectral sequence
- Adams–Novikov spectral sequence
- Eilenberg–Maclane spectrum
- Hopf algebroid
