= Comodule =

In mathematics, a comodule or corepresentation is a concept dual to a module. The definition of a comodule over a coalgebra is formed by dualizing the definition of a module over an associative algebra.

== Formal definition ==
Let K be a field, and C be a coalgebra over K. A (right) comodule over C is a K-vector space M together with a linear map

$$\rho\colon M \to M \otimes C$$

such that

1. $(\mathrm{id} \otimes \Delta) \circ \rho = (\rho \otimes \mathrm{id}) \circ \rho$
2. $(\mathrm{id} \otimes \varepsilon) \circ \rho = \mathrm{id}$,

where Δ is the comultiplication for C, and ε is the counit.

Note that in the second rule we have identified $M \otimes K$ with $M\,$.

== Examples ==
- A coalgebra is a comodule over itself.
- If M is a finite-dimensional module over a finite-dimensional K-algebra A, then the set of linear functions from A to K forms a coalgebra, and the set of linear functions from M to K forms a comodule over that coalgebra.
- A graded vector space V can be made into a comodule. Let I be the index set for the graded vector space, and let $C_I$ be the vector space with basis $e_i$ for $i \in I$. We turn $C_I$ into a coalgebra and V into a $C_I$-comodule, as follows:

1. Let the comultiplication on $C_I$ be given by $\Delta(e_i) = e_i \otimes e_i$.
2. Let the counit on $C_I$ be given by $\varepsilon(e_i) = 1\$.
3. Let the map $\rho$ on V be given by $\rho(v) = \sum v_i \otimes e_i$, where $v_i$ is the i-th homogeneous piece of $v$.

=== In algebraic topology ===
One important result in algebraic topology is the fact that homology $H_*(X)$ over the dual Steenrod algebra $\mathcal{A}^*$ forms a comodule. This comes from the fact the Steenrod algebra $\mathcal{A}$ has a canonical action on the cohomology

$\mu: \mathcal{A}\otimes H^*(X) \to H^*(X)$

When we dualize to the dual Steenrod algebra, this gives a comodule structure

$\mu^*:H_*(X) \to \mathcal{A}^*\otimes H_*(X)$

This result extends to other cohomology theories as well, such as complex cobordism and is instrumental in computing its cohomology ring $\Omega_U^*(\{pt\})$. The main reason for considering the comodule structure on homology instead of the module structure on cohomology lies in the fact the dual Steenrod algebra $\mathcal{A}^*$ is a commutative ring, and the setting of commutative algebra provides more tools for studying its structure.

== Rational comodule ==
If M is a (right) comodule over the coalgebra C, then M is a (left) module over the dual algebra C^{∗}, but the converse is not true in general: a module over C^{∗} is not necessarily a comodule over C. A rational comodule is a module over C^{∗} which becomes a comodule over C in the natural way.

== Comodule morphisms ==
Let R be a ring, M, N, and C be R-modules, and $\rho_M: M \rightarrow M \otimes C,\ \rho_N: N \rightarrow N \otimes C$ be right C-comodules. Then an R-linear map $f: M \rightarrow N$ is called a (right) comodule morphism, or (right) C-colinear, if $\rho_N \circ f = (f \otimes 1) \circ \rho_M.$ This notion is dual to the notion of a linear map between vector spaces, or, more generally, of a homomorphism between R-modules.

== See also ==
- Divided power structure
