= Maurício Peixoto =

Brazilian engineer and mathematician (1921–2019)

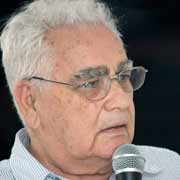
- Born: 15 April 1921; Fortaleza, Ceará, Brazil
- Died: 28 April 2019 (aged 98); Rio de Janeiro, Brazil
- Education: Universidade Federal do Rio de Janeiro
- Known for: Peixoto's theorem
- Scientific career
- Fields: Mathematics
- Workplaces: Universidade Federal do Rio de Janeiro; Universidade de São Paulo; Brown University; Instituto Nacional de Matemática Pura e Aplicada
- Doctoral students: Jorge Sotomayor Tello

Maurício Matos Peixoto (April 15, 1921 – April 28, 2019) was a Brazilian engineer and mathematician. He pioneered the studies on structural stability, and was the author of Peixoto's theorem.

== Biography ==
Maurício Peixoto, born in Fortaleza in 1921 to José Carlos de Matos Peixoto and Violeta Rodrigues Peixoto, pursued a career in mathematics since his adolescence. To fulfill his goal, Peixoto enrolled in engineering at the School of Engineering of the current Federal University of Rio de Janeiro (UFRJ).

While still working at the School of Engineering around 1955, Peixoto came into contact with the work of De Baggis, a student of Solomon Lefschetz. Through this work, he learnt about the problem of structural stability of dynamic systems. After some correspondence with Solomon Lefschetz regarding this problem, Peixoto was invited and went to Princeton University in 1957 to work as Lefschetz's student on the topic of structural stability of differential equations. Despite the great age difference (Peixoto was 36 years old and Lefschetz was 73 years old), Peixoto and Lefschetz became good friends.

Once, while talking with Lefschetz, Peixoto commented that no one cared about structural stability of dynamical systems and that was the main problem in working with it. But to Peixoto's surprise Lefschetz's answer was no less than "No Mauricio, this is no trouble, this is your luck. Try to work as hard and as fast as you can on this subject because the day will come when you will not understand a single word of what they will be saying about structural stability; this happened to me in topology."

With Lefschetz incentive, Peixoto wrote his first paper on structural stability, that would be later published on the Annals of Mathematics, of which Lefschetz was editor. In 1958, they went to the International Mathematical Congress, in Edinburgh, Scotland, where Lefschetz introduced Peixoto to the Russian mathematician Lev Pontryagin, whose work on dynamical systems was used by Peixoto as a basis for his studies. Pontryagin, though, showed no interest whatsoever in Peixoto's work.

Back to Princeton, Peixoto met Steve Smale, the mathematician that would later become a reference in dynamical systems. Smale was interested in Peixoto's work and realized he could extend his own based on it. Their contact intensified and, when Peixoto came back to Brazil, the American mathematician spent six months at the Instituto Nacional de Matemática Pura e Aplicada (Institute of Pure and Applied Mathematics or IMPA) at Rio de Janeiro. Through Smale, Peixoto would meet the French mathematician René Thom, who would help Peixoto to formulate his theorem, that was finalized during Thom's visit to IMPA.

== Awards ==
For his theorem, Peixoto won the Bunge Foundation Award in the year of 1969. According to Bunge Foundation, "the theorem of Peixoto on the structural stability in two-dimensional varieties inspired the mathematician S. Smale to create the general theory of dynamic systems".

In 1986, Peixoto was awarded the TWAS Prize by the Third World Science Academy, "for his fundamental and pioneer studies on structural stability in dynamical systems, in particular for proving that surface flows are generically structurally stable."

== Personal life ==
Peixoto married engineer and mathematician Marília Magalhães Chaves (who was known professionally by her married name) Marília Chaves Peixoto in 1946, with whom he had two children. The couple collaborated in their work, jointly published "Structural Stability in the plane with enlarged boundary conditions" in 1959, before Marília Chaves Peixoto's early death in 1961. It would be a key paper which led to the development of Peixoto's theorem.
