= Pesin Entropy Formula =

The Pesin Entropy Formula is a fundamental theorem in ergodic theory and dynamical systems. It equates the Kolmogorov-Sinai (measure-theoretic) entropy of a smooth, chaotic dynamical system to the sum of its positive Lyapunov exponents, integrated over the space. It formally bridges the gap between information-theoretic chaos (entropy) and geometric chaos (stretching of space).

== The Formula ==
Let $f: M \to M$ be a $C^2$ diffeomorphism on a compact Riemannian manifold $M$, and let $\mu$ be an$f$-invariant probability measure. If $\mu$ is absolutely continuous with respect to the Lebesgue measure (an SRB measure), the formula states:

$$h_\mu(f) = \int_M \sum_{\lambda_i(x) > 0} \chi_i(x) \lambda_i(x) \, d\mu(x)$$

Component breakdown

- $h_\mu(f)$: The measure-theoretic (Kolmogorov-Sinai) entropy, measuring the rate of information generation or unpredictability.
- $\lambda_i(x)$: The Lyapunov exponents at point $x$, which measure the exponential rates of separation of nearby orbits.
- $\chi_i(x)$: The multiplicity of the corresponding Lyapunov exponent $\lambda_i(x)$.
- $\sum_{\lambda_i(x) > 0}$: The sum is taken only over the strictly positive Lyapunov exponents (directions where the system expands and creates chaos).

== The Ruelle Inequality vs. Pesin's Formula ==
The relationship between entropy and Lyapunov exponents depends heavily on the nature of the measure $\mu$:

Ruelle's Inequality (General Case): For any invariant probability measure $\mu$ on a $C^1$ system, David Ruelle proved that entropy is always bounded above by the positive exponents:

$h_\mu(f) \leq \int_M \sum_{\lambda_i(x) > 0} \chi_i(x) \lambda_i(x) \, d\mu(x)$

Pesin's Identity (Special Case): Yakov Pesin proved in 1977 that this inequality becomes an exact equality if and only if the measure $\mu$ is smooth enough—specifically, if it has absolutely continuous conditional measures on unstable manifolds (e.g., Lebesgue or SRB measures).

== Physical and Intuitive Meaning ==
Information vs. Geometry: The left side ($h_\mu(f)$) represents how fast you lose track of a particle's position when looking at it through a coarse grid. The right side represents the geometric rate at which the system stretches phase space. Pesin's formula says that all geometric stretching results directly in an equal amount of information creation.

Dissipative Systems: In attracting systems (like a Lorenz attractor), the total sum of all Lyapunov exponents is negative (the system shrinks in volume overall). However, because the formula only sums the positive exponents, the entropy remains positive, reflecting the chaotic dynamics along the attractor.

== The Ledrappier Young formula ==
The generalized version of the Pesin entropy formula that incorporates geometric dimensions is known as the Ledrappier–Young formula.

Established by François Ledrappier and Lai-Sang Young in 1985, this theorem generalizes Pesin's identity to any invariant probability measure $\mu$—even highly fractal, singular measures like those found on strange attractors—by weighting each positive Lyapunov exponent by its corresponding directional Hausdorff dimension.

=== The Formula ===
Let $f: M \to M$ be a $C^2$ diffeomorphism of a compact manifold, and let $\mu$ be any $f$-invariant probability measure. The measure-theoretic entropy $h_\mu(f)$ satisfies:

$$h_\mu(f) = \int_M \sum_{i=1}^{k(x)} \lambda_i(x) \delta_i(x) \, d\mu(x)$$

=== Component Breakdown ===
- $\lambda_i(x)$: The distinct strictly positive Lyapunov exponents at the point $x$, ordered such that $\lambda_1 > \lambda_2 > \dots > \lambda_k > 0$.
- $\delta_i(x)$: The partial dimensions (or directional Hausdorff dimensions) of the measure $\mu$ along the unstable manifolds.
- $\sum \lambda_i \delta_i$: Instead of summing just the raw exponents (multiplied by integer geometric multiplicity), each stretching rate is scaled precisely by how densely the measure $\mu$ fills out that specific expanding direction.

=== Understanding the Partial Dimensions (δi) ===
To understand $\delta_i$, imagine the total unstable manifold at a point $x$, which represents all directions of exponential stretching. This unstable manifold can be filtered into a nested hierarchy of sub-manifolds based on the strength of the expansion rates:

$$\mathcal{W}^{u,1} \subset \mathcal{W}^{u,2} \subset \dots \subset \mathcal{W}^{u,k} = \mathcal{W}^u$$

Where $\mathcal{W}^{u,i}$ is the sub-manifold corresponding to all expansion rates greater than or equal to $\lambda_i$.

The parameter $\delta_i$ measures the Hausdorff dimension of the conditional measure of $\mu$ along the factor space between $\mathcal{W}^{u,i}$ and $\mathcal{W}^{u,i-1}$. It quantifies the "fractional geometry" of the measure along that specific expanding profile. The value of $\delta_i$ is bounded by the geometric multiplicity $\chi_i$ of the exponent: $0 \le \delta_i \le \chi_i$.

=== Bridging to the Standard Pesin Formula ===
The Ledrappier–Young formula beautifully unifies smooth measures and fractal measures:

Case 1: SRB and Lebesgue Measures (Pesin's Identity)—If $\mu$ is an SRB (Sinai–Ruelle–Bowen) measure or is absolutely continuous with respect to Lebesgue measure, it completely and smoothly fills out the unstable manifolds. Therefore, the partial dimension matches the full geometric multiplicity of the space: $\delta_i(x) = \chi_i(x)$. The formula collapses exactly back to Pesin's Entropy Formula:

$$h_\mu(f) = \int_M \sum \chi_i(x) \lambda_i(x) \, d\mu(x)$$

Case 2: Fractal Attractors (Ruelle's Inequality)—For a typical chaotic attractor (like the Henon attractor), the measure is highly singular and looks like a Cantor set when sliced transversely. Because it contains structural "gaps," the measure cannot fully occupy the expanding space, meaning $\delta_i(x) < \chi_i(x)$. This explains geometrically why $h_\mu(f)$ is strictly less than the sum of the positive Lyapunov exponents, satisfying Ruelle's Inequality as a strict inequality.
