= Andronov–Pontryagin criterion =

Mathematics concept

The Andronov–Pontryagin criterion is a necessary and sufficient condition for the stability of dynamical systems in the plane. It was derived by Aleksandr Andronov and Lev Pontryagin in 1937.

== Statement ==
A dynamical system

$$\dot{x} = v(x),$$

where $v$ is a $C^{1}$-vector field on the plane, $x \in \mathbb{R}^{2}$, is orbitally topologically stable if and only if the following two conditions hold:

1. All equilibrium points and periodic orbits are hyperbolic.
2. There are no saddle connections.

The same statement holds if the vector field $v$ is defined on the unit disk and is transversal to the boundary.

== Clarifications ==
Orbital topological stability of a dynamical system means that for any sufficiently small perturbation (in the C^{1}-metric), there exists a homeomorphism close to the identity map which transforms the orbits of the original dynamical system to the orbits of the perturbed system (cf structural stability).

The first condition of the theorem is known as global hyperbolicity. A zero of a vector field v, i.e. a point x_{0} where v(x_{0})=0, is said to be hyperbolic if none of the eigenvalues of the linearization of v at x_{0} is purely imaginary. A periodic orbit of a flow is said to be hyperbolic if none of the eigenvalues of the Poincaré return map at a point on the orbit has absolute value one.

Finally, saddle connection refers to a situation where an orbit from one saddle point enters the same or another saddle point, i.e. the unstable and stable separatrices are connected (cf homoclinic orbit and heteroclinic orbit).

== See also ==
- Peixoto's theorem
