= Norman Steenrod =

American mathematician (1910–1971)

Norman Earl Steenrod
- Born: April 22, 1910; Dayton, Ohio, U.S.
- Died: 14 October 1971 (aged 61); Princeton, New Jersey, U.S.
- Citizenship: American
- Education: University of Michigan (BA); Harvard University (MA); Princeton University (PhD)
- Known for: Steenrod algebra Steenrod homology Steenrod problem Steenrod squares Eilenberg–Steenrod axioms Myers–Steenrod theorem Local system
- Awards: Guggenheim Fellowship (1950); Colloquium Lecture (1957)
- Scientific career
- Fields: Mathematics
- Workplaces: University of Chicago; University of Michigan; Princeton University
- Thesis: Universal Homology Groups (1936)
- Doctoral advisor: Solomon Lefschetz
- Doctoral students: José Adem; Peter J. Freyd; Samuel Gitler; Wu-Chung Hsiang; Jerome Levine; William S. Massey; Paul A. Schweitzer; Edwin Spanier; George W. Whitehead

Norman Earl Steenrod (April 22, 1910 – October 14, 1971) was an American mathematician most widely known for his contributions to the field of algebraic topology.

== Life ==
Norman Earl Steenrod was born in Dayton, Ohio, on Friday, April 22, 1910, and educated at Miami University and University of Michigan (A.B. 1932). After receiving his master's degree from Harvard University in 1934, he enrolled at Princeton University. He completed his Ph.D. under the supervision of Solomon Lefschetz, defending a thesis titled Universal homology groups.

Steenrod held positions at the University of Chicago from 1939 to 1942, and the University of Michigan from 1942 to 1947. In 1947, he moved to Princeton University and remained on the faculty there for the rest of his career. He was an editor of the Annals of Mathematics and a member of the National Academy of Sciences. He died in Princeton on October 14, 1971.

== Work ==
Thanks to Lefschetz and others, the cup product structure of cohomology was understood by the early 1940s. Norman Earl Steenrod was able to define operations from one cohomology group to another (the so-called Steenrod squares) that generalized the cup product. The additional structure made cohomology a finer invariant. The Steenrod cohomology operations form a (non-commutative) algebra under composition, known as the Steenrod algebra.

His book (The Topology of Fibre Bundles) is a standard reference. In collaboration with Samuel Eilenberg, he was a founder of the axiomatic approach to homology theory. See Eilenberg–Steenrod axioms.

== See also ==
- Abstract nonsense
- Fiber bundle

== Publications ==
- Steenrod, Norman E. (1943). "Homology with local coefficients". Annals of Mathematics. 44 (4): 610–627. doi:10.2307/1969099. JSTOR 1969099. MR 0009114.
- Eilenberg, Samuel; Steenrod, Norman E. (1945). "Axiomatic approach to homology theory". Proceedings of the National Academy of Sciences of the United States of America. 31 (4): 117–120. Bibcode:1945PNAS...31..117E. doi:10.1073/pnas.31.4.117. MR 0012228. PMC 1078770. PMID 16578143.
- Steenrod, Norman E. (1947). "Products of cocycles and extensions of mappings". Annals of Mathematics. 48 (2): 290–320. doi:10.2307/1969172. JSTOR 1969172. MR 0022071.
- Steenrod, Norman E. (1962), Epstein, David B. A. (ed.), Cohomology operations, Annals of Mathematics Studies, vol. 50, Princeton University Press, ISBN 978-0-691-07924-0, MR 0145525
