= Indefinite inner product space =

Vector space in functional analysis

In mathematics, in the field of functional analysis, an indefinite inner product space is a complex vector space $K$ equipped with a Hermitian form $\langle \cdot,\,\cdot \rangle$ such that there exist $x, y \in K$ with $\langle x, x \rangle > 0$ and $\langle y, y \rangle < 0$.

An indefinite inner product space is called a Krein space if $(K, \langle \cdot,\,\cdot \rangle)$ can be decomposed into two orthogonal spaces $K = K_- \oplus K_+$ such that both $(K_+, \langle \cdot,\,\cdot \rangle)$ and $(K_-, -\langle \cdot,\,\cdot \rangle)$ are complete and positive-definite (i.e. Hilbert spaces).

A Pontryagin space is a Krein space where $K_+$ or $K_-$ is finite-dimensional. Equivalently, its rank of indefiniteness $\kappa = \min \{ \dim K_{+}, \dim K_{-} \}$ is finite. A Pontryagin space is also called a $\Pi_\kappa$-space. Pontryagin spaces are named after Lev Pontryagin.

== Subspaces ==
The following subsets are defined in terms of the square norm induced by the indefinite inner product:

$K_{0} \ \stackrel{\mathrm{def}}{=}\ \{ x \in K : \langle x,\,x \rangle = 0 \}$ ("neutral")
$K_{++} \ \stackrel{\mathrm{def}}{=}\ \{ x \in K : \langle x,\,x \rangle > 0 \}$ ("positive")
$K_{--} \ \stackrel{\mathrm{def}}{=}\ \{ x \in K : \langle x,\,x \rangle < 0 \}$ ("negative")
$K_{+0} \ \stackrel{\mathrm{def}}{=}\ K_{++} \cup K_{0}$ ("non-negative")
$K_{-0} \ \stackrel{\mathrm{def}}{=}\ K_{--} \cup K_{0}$ ("non-positive")

The following types of subspaces are defined:

- neutral: a subspace of $K$ contained entirely in $K_{0}$
- positive definite: $K_{++} \cup \{0\}$
- negative definite: $K_{--} \cup \{0\}$
- positive semi-definite: $K_{+0}$
- negative semi-definite: $K_{-0}$

A subspace is semi-definite iff it is one of these 5 categories. All other subspaces are indefinite.

Given a subspace $L$ of $K$, we define its

- orthogonal companion: $L^\perp = \{ x \in K : \langle x,\,y \rangle = 0 \text{ for all } y \in L \}$.
- isotropic part: $L^0 = L \cap L^\perp$.

$L$ is nondegenerate iff $L^0 = \{0\}$. For example, in $\C^{1+1}$ the null line through $(1, 1)$ is its own isotropic part.

== Krein space decomposition ==
By definition, a Krein space is decomposable into two orthogonal spaces $K = K_- \oplus K_+$ such that both $(K_+, \langle \cdot,\,\cdot \rangle)$ and $(K_-, -\langle \cdot,\,\cdot \rangle)$ are Hilbert. Such a decomposition is called a fundamental decomposition.

Given a fundamental decomposition, we define correspondingly:

- The corresponding projection operators $P_\pm$. They are the identity on $K_\pm$ and zero on $K_\mp$.
- The metric operator or fundamental symmetry operator $J \ \stackrel{\mathrm{def}}{=}\ P_+ - P_-$.
- The Hilbert inner product $(\cdot,\,\cdot)$:
  $$(x,\,y) \ \stackrel{\mathrm{def}}{=}\  \langle x,\,Jy \rangle = \langle x,\,P_+ y \rangle - \langle x,\,P_- y \rangle$$
  It is positive definite and makes $K$ the Hilbert space $K_+ \oplus K_-$.

Despite the name, the "fundamental" decomposition is highly non-unique. The metric operator (or fundamental symmetry) and the Hilbert inner product are not unique either. Any Krein space has infinitely many fundamental decompositions. Concretely, consider $\C^{1+1}$, the space $\C^2$ with $\langle z, z \rangle = |z_1|^2 - |z_2|^2$. A fundamental decomposition picks a positive line $K_+$ through $(1, w)$ with $|w| < 1$. Its orthogonal complement $K_-$ is the line through $(\bar w, 1)$. The fundamental decompositions form the open unit disk.

Despite this non-uniqueness, all fundamental decompositions give equivalent norms, which define the same topology on $K$.

This may be pictured in a special relativity spacetime diagram $\R^{1+1}$. A decomposition is made by drawing a spacelike axis and a timelike axis orthogonally to each other. The spacelike axis intersects the $\langle x, x \rangle = +1$ hyperbola at $\pm p_{\text{space}}$, and the timelike axis intersects the $\langle x, x \rangle = -1$ hyperbola at $\pm p_{\text{time}}$. The two intersection points define an ellipse $\{y \in \R^{1+1} : (y, y) = 1\}$. The ellipse kisses the two hyperbola at $\pm p_{\text{space}}, \pm p_{\text{time}}$.

The decomposition is not unique, since a Lorentz boost squeezes both space and time. Such a boost squeezes the ellipse too. However, any squeezed ellipse can be scaled down to fit inside the original ellipse, and scaled up to contain the original ellipse. Thus, it defines an equivalent norm.

== Applications ==
- In quantum electrodynamics, the Gupta–Bleuler formalism quantizes the electromagnetic field on a state space with an indefinite inner product. The scalar photons have states of negative norm.
- In relativistic quantum mechanics, the Dirac equation acts on four-component spinors $\psi \in \C^4$. The positive inner product $\psi^\dagger \phi$ is not invariant under Lorentz boosts. The invariant one is $\bar\psi \phi = \psi^\dagger \gamma^0 \phi$, an indefinite inner product of signature (2, 2).
- In complex analysis, the Nehari problem and the bitangential Nevanlinna–Pick problem for meromorphic functions are solved through invariant maximal semi-definite subspaces of Krein spaces.
- In estimation and control, H^{∞} filters are Kalman filters run in a Krein space.
- In machine learning, a kernel that is not positive semidefinite has a feature space that is a Krein space, a reproducing kernel Krein space.
