= Jerome Levine =

American mathematician

Jerome Paul Levine (May 4, 1937 – April 8, 2006) was a mathematician who contributed to the understanding of knot theory.

== Education and career ==
Born in New York City, Levine received his B.S. from Massachusetts Institute of Technology in 1958, and his Ph.D. in mathematics from Princeton University in 1962, studying under Norman Steenrod. He began his career as an instructor at M.I.T., after which he spent a year at the University of Cambridge under a National Science Foundation postdoctoral fellowship. He became a professor at the University of California, Berkeley in 1964, and in 1966 he left for Brandeis University. His early work helped to develop surgery theory as a powerful tool in knot theory and in geometric topology. In 1970 he was an Invited Speaker at the International Congress of Mathematicians in Nice.

Jerome Levine died after a long and hard-fought battle with lymphatic cancer at the age of 68. He was an active mathematician at Brandeis until his death, with his last paper published four months after he died.
