= Marília Chaves Peixoto =

Brazilian mathematician

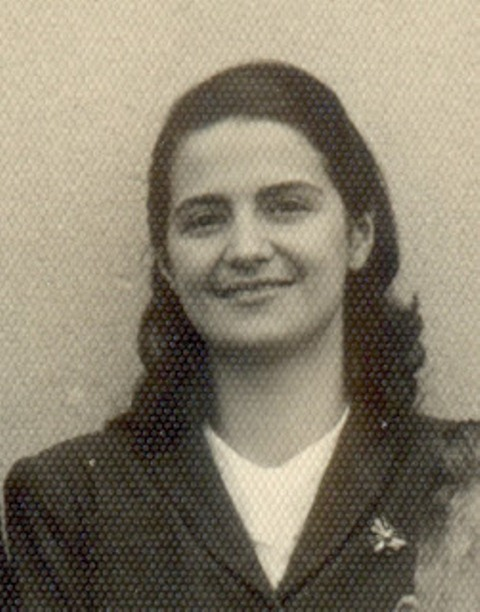
- Born: February 24, 1921
- Died: January 5, 1961 (aged 39)
- Education: Federal University of Rio de Janeiro
- Occupations: Mathematician and engineer
- Spouse: Maurício Peixoto

Marília Chaves Peixoto (24 February 1921 – 5 January 1961) was a Brazilian mathematician and engineer who worked in dynamical systems. Peixoto was the first Brazilian woman to receive a doctorate in mathematics and the first Brazilian woman to join the Brazilian Academy of Sciences.

== Early life and education ==
Marília Magalhães Chaves was born on 24 February 1921, to Tullio de Saboia Chaves and Zillah da Costa Magalhaes, in Santana do Livramento. She had two siblings, Lúcia de Magalhaes Chaves and Livio de Magalhaes Chaves.

In an interview from 1952, she would describe her educational upbringing, stating that despite the high school in Santana do Livramento not accepting girls as students, the priests helped her enroll as a private student and take tests in the school.

She later moved to Rio de Janeiro, studying at the Colégio Andrews, a secular school that allowed boys and girls to study. She graduated as an outstanding student. She studied superior courses and studied for the entrance exam of the Escola Nacional de Engenharia (National School of Engineering) at the Federal University of Rio de Janeiro. She achieved third place in the entrance exam rankings and was accepted.

In 1939 she enrolled at the Escola Nacional de Engenharia, working alongside Leopoldo Nachbin and Maurício Peixoto (whom she would later marry).

== Career ==
Peixoto graduated from the Federal University of Rio de Janeiro in 1943 with a degree in engineering, having also studied mathematics at the university and acted as a monitor for the university's National Faculty of Philosophy. In 1948, she received a doctorate in mathematics, and began teaching at the Escola Politécnica da UFRJ. In 1949, Peixoto published "On the inequalities $y'' \ge G(x,y,y',y'')$" in Annals of the Brazilian Academy of Sciences.

Following her work on convex functions, Peixoto was appointed an associate member of the Brazilian Academy of Science on 12 June 1951. She was the first Brazilian woman to join the organization, and the second woman after Marie Curie, a foreign associate of the academy.

Peixoto married Maurício Peixoto in 1946. In 1949 they traveled to Chicago for the International Congress of Mathematicians of 1950. Despite being a participant in her own right, in the list of members she was listed as Maurício's spouse ("Mrs. Peixoto") rather than her full title.

In 1955, Peixoto published Cálculo vetorial (Vector calculus), a book aimed at students that is more focus on applications of vector calculus than proofs of results.

Marília and Maurício jointly published "Structural Stability in the plane with enlarged boundary conditions" in 1959, one of several papers which led to Peixoto's theorem.

She died on 5 January 1961, aged 39.

She received a number of posthumous honors, including:

- Rua Marília Chaves Peixoto - A street in her hometown of Santana do Livramento, named after her.
- Municipal School Marília Chaves Peixoto - A school in Petrópolis her husband helped establish in her name in 1971. It was funded by award money he received for Peixoto's Theorem.

== Personal life ==
Peixoto had two children, Marta and Ricardo, with Maurício Peixoto.

== Published works ==
- 1949: On the inequalities $y'' \ge G(x,y,y',y'')$. - Ph.D. thesis.
- 1955: Cálculo Vetorial: notas de aula. - book.
- 1959: Structural stability in the plane with enlarged boundary conditions. - paper.
