= Vladimir Boltyansky =

Soviet and Russian mathematician, educator, and author (1925–2019)

Vladimir Grigorevich Boltyansky
- Born: April 26, 1925; Moscow, USSR
- Died: April 16, 2019 (aged 93)
- Scientific career
- Fields: Mathematics
- Thesis: (1955)

Vladimir Grigorevich Boltyansky (Russian: Влади́мир Григо́рьевич Болтя́нский; 26 April 1925 – 16 April 2019), also transliterated as Boltyanski, Boltyanskii, or Boltjansky, was a Soviet and Russian mathematician, educator and author of popular mathematical books and articles. He was best known for his books on topology, combinatorial geometry and Hilbert's third problem.

== Biography ==
Boltyansky was born in Moscow. He served in the Soviet army during World War II, when he was a signaller on the 2nd Belorussian Front. He graduated from Moscow University in 1948, where his advisor was Lev Pontryagin. He defended his "Doktor nauk in physics and mathematics" (higher doctorate) degree in 1955, became a professor in 1959.

Boltyansky was awarded the Lenin Prize (for the work led by Pontryagin, Revaz Gamkrelidze, and Evgenii Mishchenko) for applications of differential equations to optimal control, where he was one of the discoverers of the Pontryagin's maximum principle. In 1967 he received Uzbek SSR prize for the work on ordered rings. He taught at CIMAT.

He was the corresponding member of the Russian Academy of Education. He was the author of over 200 books and mathematical articles.
