= Tamaz V. Gamkrelidze =

Georgian linguist (1929–2021)

- თამაზ გამყრელიძე
- Born: October 23, 1929; Kutaisi, Georgian SSR, Transcaucasian SFSR, USSR
- Died: February 10, 2021 (aged 91); Tbilisi, Georgia
- Citizenship: Soviet Union (until 1991); Georgia (since 1991)
- Education: Doctor of Sciences in Philology, Tbilisi State University (1962)
- Occupations: Linguist, university teacher, politician and Hittitologist
- Employer: Tbilisi State University
- Awards: Lenin Prize; Order of Friendship of Peoples; Honoured Scientist of the Georgian SSR; Ivane Javakhishvili Prize

Tamaz Valerianis dze Gamkrelidze (Georgian: თამაზ ვალერიანის ძე გამყრელიძე; 23 October 1929 – 10 February 2021) was a Georgian linguist, orientalist public benefactor and Hittitologist, Academic (since 1974) and President (2005–2013) of the Georgian Academy of Sciences (GAS), Doctor of Sciences (1963), Professor (1964).

== Biography ==
Gamkrelidze was born in Kutaisi, Georgian SSR. His brother Revaz Gamkrelidze was a mathematician.

Tamaz Gamkrelidze graduated from the Faculty of Oriental Studies of the Tbilisi State University (TSU) in 1952. Since 1964, Gamkrelidze was a professor at this university, and since 1966 the Head of the Chair of Structural and Applied Linguistics. In 1973–2006, he was a Director of the Tsereteli Institute of Oriental Studies (Tbilisi). He was the author of many outstanding works in the fields of Indo-European linguistics, Ancient languages, Theoretical linguistics, Structural and Applied Linguistics and Kartvelology. He was a leading proponent of the glottalic theory of Proto-Indo-European consonants.

In the 1980s, Gamkrelidze worked with Vyacheslav Ivanov on a new theory of Indo-European migrations, which was most recently advocated by them in Indo-European and Indo-Europeans (1995).

In 1988–1995, he edited the premier linguistics journal of the Russian Academy of Science "Voprosy jazykoznanija". He was a Foreign Associate of the United States National Academy of Sciences (2006), Foreign Honorary Member of the American Academy of Arts & Sciences, Corresponding Fellow of the British Academy, Fellow of the European Society of Linguistics (in 1986-1988 President of this Society), Corresponding Member of the Austrian Academy of Sciences, Academician of the Russian Academy of Science, a Fellow of the World Academy of Art and Science (2006), Doctor honoris causa of the Bonn University (Germany) and the University of Chicago (U.S.), Honorary Member of the Linguistic Society of America, etc. He has received the Lenin Prize (1988), the Humboldt International Prize (1989) and the Ivane Javakhishvili Prize of the Georgian Academy of Sciences (1992). From 1992 to 2005, Gamkrelidze was a member of the Parliament of Georgia.

In August 1991, Tamaz Gamkrelidze was appointed the Rector of the Tbilisi State University, however, he stayed on this post for a very short time.

Since 2000, he was an honorary citizen of Tbilisi.

Gamkrelidze died on 10 February 2021, aged 91.

== Selected bibliography ==
- “The Akkado-Hittite syllabary and the problem of the origin of the Hittite script”, Archiv Orientální, vol. 29 (1960).
- Anatolian languages and the problem of Indo-European migration to Asia Minor, Studies in General and Oriental Linguistics. Tokyo, 1970
- with V. V. Ivanov, Indoevropjskij jazyk i indoevropejcy: Rekonstrukcija i istoriko-tipologieskij analiz prajazyka i protokultury. Tiflis: Tiflis University Press 1984. xcvi + 1328 p.
  - English translation: Indo-European and the Indo-Europeans: A reconstruction and historical analysis of a proto-language and a proto-culture. 2 vols. Trans. J. Nichols. Berlin–New York: Mouton de Gruyter, 1: 1994, 2: 1995.
- with V. V. Ivanov, “The ancient Near East and the Indo-European question: Temporal and territorial characteristics of Proto-Indo-European based on linguistic and historico-cultural data”, Soviet Studies in History vol. 22, no. 1–2 (1983): 7–52. doi: 10.2753/RSH1061-19832201027
- with V. V. Ivanov, “The migrations of tribes speaking Indo-European dialects from their original homeland in the Near East to their historical habitations in Eurasia”, Soviet Studies in History vol. 22, no. 1–2 (1983): 53–95. doi: 10.2753/RSH1061-198322010253
- “Proto-Indo-European as a Stative-Active Typology”, in Indogermanica et Caucasica: Festschrift für Karl Horst Schmidt zum 65. Geburtstag, eds. Roland Bielmeier & Reinhard Stempel. Berlin–NY: Mouton de Gruyter, 1994, pp. 25–34.
- Alphabetic writing and the old Georgian script. New York: Caravan Books, 1994.
- Ivo Hajnal, ed. Thomas V. Gamkrelidze, Selected writings: Linguistic sign, typology and language reconstruction. Innsbruck 2006.

== See also ==
- Georgian Academy of Sciences
- Glottalic theory
