= Mikhail Zelikin =

Russian mathematician

Mikhail I. Zelikin
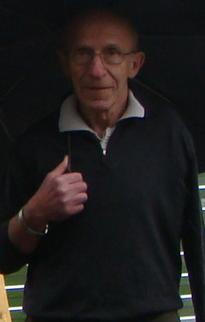
- Born: 11 February 1936; Moscow
- Education: Moscow State University
- Scientific career
- Fields: Mathematics
- Workplaces: Moscow State University, Steklov Mathematical Institute
- Doctoral advisor: Lev S. Pontryagin

Mikhail Il'ich Zelikin (Russian: Михаил Ильич Зеликин; born 11 February 1936) is a Russian mathematician, who works on differential equations (in particular, Riccati equations), optimal control theory, differential games (for instance, Princess and monster game), the theory of fields of extremals for multiple integrals, the geometry of Grassmannians. He proposed an explanation of ball lightning based on the hypothesis of plasma superconductivity.

== Biography ==
M. I. Zelikin was born in Moscow in 1936. He attended Moscow State University (Faculty of Mechanics and Mathematics) in 1953. After graduating from the university in 1958, he works there and in Steklov Institute of Mathematics. He got his Ph.D. under the supervision of Lev S. Pontryagin.

M. I. Zelikin was awarded the Chebyshev Award in 1987 and the Lyapunov Award in 2010. He was elected a corresponding member of the Russian Academy of Sciences in 2011.

Apart from mathematics, M. I. Zelikin is also known due to his activity in ecology, in particular, criticism of the Northern river reversal. He wrote and published a book of memoirs «History of Evergreen Life» (Russian: «История вечнозелёной жизни», — Moscow, 2001) about it.

== Selected monographs ==
- Zelikin, M. I.; Borisov, V. F. Theory of chattering control. With applications to astronautics, robotics, economics, and engineering. Systems & Control: Foundations & Applications. Birkhäuser Boston, Inc., Boston, MA, 1994. xvi+242 pp. ISBN 0-8176-3618-8.
- Zelikin, M. I. Control theory and optimization. I. Homogeneous spaces and the Riccati equation in the calculus of variations. Encyclopaedia of Mathematical Sciences, 86. Springer-Verlag, Berlin, 2000. xii+284 pp. ISBN 3-540-66741-5.
- Zelikin, M. I. Optimal control and variational calculus. Editorial URSS, Moscow, 2004 (in Russian) & 2010 (in Spanish).
