= Eilenberg–MacLane spectrum =

In mathematics, specifically algebraic topology, there is a distinguished class of spectra called Eilenberg–MacLane spectra $HA$ for any abelian group $A$^{pg 134}. Note, this construction can be generalized to commutative rings $R$ as well from its underlying abelian group. These are an important class of spectra because they model ordinary integral cohomology and cohomology with coefficients in an abelian group. In addition, they are a lift of the homological structure in the derived category $D(\mathbb{Z})$ of abelian groups in the homotopy category of spectra. In addition, these spectra can be used to construct resolutions of spectra, called Adams resolutions, which are used in the construction of the Adams spectral sequence.

== Definition ==
For a fixed abelian group $A$ let $HA$ denote the set of Eilenberg–MacLane spaces

$\{ K(A,0), K(A,1), K(A,2), \ldots \}$

with the adjunction map coming from the property of loop spaces of Eilenberg–MacLane spaces: namely, because there is a homotopy equivalence

$K(A,n-1)\simeq \Omega K(A,n)$

we can construct maps $\Sigma K(A,n-1) \to K(A,n)$ from the adjunction $[\Sigma(X),Y]\simeq [X,\Omega(Y)]$ giving the desired structure maps of the set to get a spectrum. This collection is called the Eilenberg–MacLane spectrum of $A$^{pg 134}.

== Properties ==
Using the Eilenberg–MacLane spectrum $H\mathbb{Z}$ we can define the notion of cohomology of a spectrum $X$ and the homology of a spectrum $X$^{pg 42}. Using the functor

$[-,H\mathbb{Z}]:\textbf{Spectra}^{op} \to \text{GrAb}$

we can define cohomology simply as

$H^*(E) = [E,H\mathbb{Z}]$

Note that for a CW complex $X$, the cohomology of the suspension spectrum $\Sigma^\infty X$ recovers the cohomology of the original space $X$. Note that we can define the dual notion of homology as

$H_*(X) = \pi_*(E\wedge X) = [\mathbb{S},E\wedge X]$

which can be interpreted as a "dual" to the usual hom-tensor adjunction in spectra. Note that instead of $H\mathbb{Z}$, we take $HA$ for some abelian group $A$, we recover the usual (co)homology with coefficients in the abelian group $A$ and denote it by $H^*(X;A)$.

=== Mod-p spectra and the Steenrod algebra ===
For the Eilenberg–MacLane spectrum $H\mathbb{Z}/p$ there is an isomorphism

$H^*(H\mathbb{Z}/p, \mathbb{Z}/p) \cong [H\mathbb{Z}/p,H\mathbb{Z}/p] \cong \mathcal{A}_p$

for the p-Steenrod algebra $\mathcal{A}_p$.

== Tools for computing Adams resolutions ==
One of the quintessential tools for computing stable homotopy groups is the Adams spectral sequence. In order to make this construction, the use of Adams resolutions are employed. These depend on the following properties of Eilenberg–MacLane spectra. We define a generalized Eilenberg–MacLane spectrum $K$ as a finite wedge of suspensions of Eilenberg–MacLane spectra $HA_i$, so

$K := \Sigma^{k_1}HA_1\wedge\cdots\wedge\Sigma^{k_n}HA_n$

Note that for $\Sigma^kHA$ and a spectrum $X$

$[X,\Sigma^kHA] \cong H^{*+k}(X;A)$

so it shifts the degree of cohomology classes. For the rest of the article $HA_i = HA$ for some fixed abelian group $A$.

=== Equivalence of maps to K ===
Note that a homotopy class $f \in [X,K]$ represents a finite collection of elements in $H^*(X;A)$. Conversely, any finite collection of elements in $H^*(X;A)$ is represented by some homotopy class $f \in [X,K]$.

==== Constructing a surjection ====
For a locally finite collection of elements in $H^*(X;A)$ generating it as an abelian group, the associated map $f: X \to K$ induces a surjection on cohomology, meaning if we evaluate these spectra on some topological space $S$, there is always a surjection

$f^*:K(S) \to X(S)$

of abelian groups.

=== Steenrod-module structure on cohomology of spectra ===
For a spectrum $X$ taking the wedge $X\wedge H\mathbb{Z}/p$ constructs a spectrum which is homotopy equivalent to a generalized Eilenberg–MacLane space with one wedge summand for each $\mathbb{Z}/p$ generator or $H^*(X;\mathbb{Z}/p)$. In particular, it gives the structure of a module over the Steenrod algebra $\mathcal{A}_p$ for $H^*(X)$. This is because the equivalence stated before can be read as

$H^*(X\wedge H\mathbb{Z}/p) \cong \mathcal{A}_p\otimes H^*(X)$

and the map $f: X \to X \wedge H\mathbb{Z}/p$ induces the $\mathcal{A}_p$-structure.

== See also ==
- Adams spectral sequence
- Homotopy groups of spheres
