= Steenrod homology =

In algebraic topology, Steenrod homology is a homology theory for compact metric spaces introduced by Norman Steenrod (1940, 1941), based on regular cycles. It is similar to the homology theory introduced rather sketchily by Andrey Kolmogorov in 1936.
