= Pontryagin cohomology operation =

In mathematics, a Pontryagin cohomology operation is a cohomology operation taking cohomology classes in H^{2n}(X,Z/p^{r}Z) to H^{2pn}(X,Z/p^{r+1}Z) for some prime number p. When p=2 these operations were introduced by Pontryagin (1942) and were named Pontrjagin squares by Whitehead (1949) (with the term "Pontryagin square" also being used). They were generalized to arbitrary primes by Thomas (1956).

== See also ==
- Steenrod operation
