= Yuli Rudyak =

Yuli B. Rudyak (24 April 1948 - 24 August 2024) was a professor of mathematics at the University of Florida in Gainesville, Florida. He obtained his doctorate from Moscow State University under the supervision of M. M. Postnikov. His main research interests are geometry, topology and symplectic topology.

== Books ==
- Rudyak, Yu. (1998), On Thom spectra, orientability, and cobordism. With a foreword by Haynes Miller, Springer Monographs in Mathematics, Berlin: Springer-Verlag

Reviewer Donald M. Davis (mathematician) for MathSciNet wrote: "This book provides an excellent and thorough treatment of various topics related to cobordism. It should become an indispensable tool for advanced graduate students and workers in algebraic topology."
The book listed 118 cites at Google Scholar in 2011.

== Personal life ==
Rudyak is the father of Marina Rudyak, who is an Assistant Professor of Chinese Studies at the University of Heidelberg.
