= Revaz Gamkrelidze =

Georgian and Soviet mathematician (1927–2025)

Revaz Valerianovich Gamkrelidze
- Born: February 4, 1927; Kutaisi, Georgian SSR, Transcaucasian SFSR, USSR
- Died: May 5, 2025 (aged 98)
- Education: Moscow State University
- Awards: Lenin Prize (1962)
- Scientific career
- Fields: Mathematics
- Doctoral advisor: Lev Pontryagin

Revaz Valerianovic Gamkrelidze (Georgian: რევაზ ვალერიანის ძე გამყრელიძე, ISO 9984: Revaz Valeris je Gamqrelije; February 4, 1927 – May 5, 2025) was a Soviet and Georgian mathematician known for his work in optimal control theory and related fields. He was a member of the Georgian Academy of Sciences and of the Russian Academy of Sciences.

== Background ==
After secondary school, Gamkrelidze attended Tbilisi State University. In his sophomore year, he went to Moscow to study at the mechanics and mathematics faculty of Moscow State University where he became a student of Pontryagin.

Gamkrelidze died on May 5, 2025, at the age of 98. He was the brother of the linguist Tamaz Gamkrelidze.

== Work ==
At Moscow State University, he initially worked in the fields of algebraic geometry and topology, and derived what is now known as Gamkrelidze's formula. In 1954 he began his work on optimal control. He wrote Mathematical Theory of Optimal Processes with Pontryagin, Boltyanskii and Mishchenko. This work was awarded the State Lenin Prize for Science and Technology in 1962. Gamkrelidze was the founding editor of Encyclopedia of Mathematical Sciences.

=== Books ===
- L.S. Pontryagin; V.G. Boltyanskii; R.V. Gamkrelidze; E.F. Mischenko (1962). The Mathematical Theory of Optimal Processes. Translated to English by Trirogoff. Interscience Publishers. MR 0166037
- R.V. Gamkrelidze (1978). Principles of Optimal Control Theory. Translated from Russian original published by Tbilisi University Press, Tbilisi. New York: Plenum Press. MR 0686792
  - Gamkrelidze, R. (9 March 2013). Principles of Optimal Control Theory. Springer. ISBN 978-1-4684-7398-8.
