= Dmitri Anosov =

Russian mathematician

Dmitri Victorovich Anosov
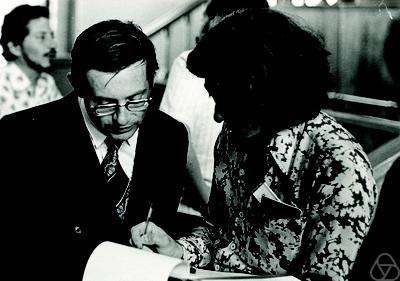
- Born: November 30, 1936; Moscow, Soviet Union
- Died: August 5, 2014 (aged 77)
- Known for: Dynamical systems theory
- Awards: USSR State Prize 1976
- Scientific career
- Fields: Mathematician
- Doctoral advisor: Lev Pontryagin
- Doctoral students: Yakov Pesin

Dmitri Victorovich Anosov (Russian: Дми́трий Ви́кторович Ано́сов; November 30, 1936 – August 7, 2014) was a Russian mathematician active during the Soviet Union. He is best known for his contributions to dynamical systems theory.

He was a full member of the Russian Academy of Sciences and a laureate of the USSR State Prize (1976). He was a student of Lev Pontryagin. In 2014, he died at the age of 77.

== See also ==
- Anosov diffeomorphism
- Anosov map
- Pseudo-Anosov map
