= Alexey Postnikov =

Soviet historian (born 1939)

Alexey V. Postnikov
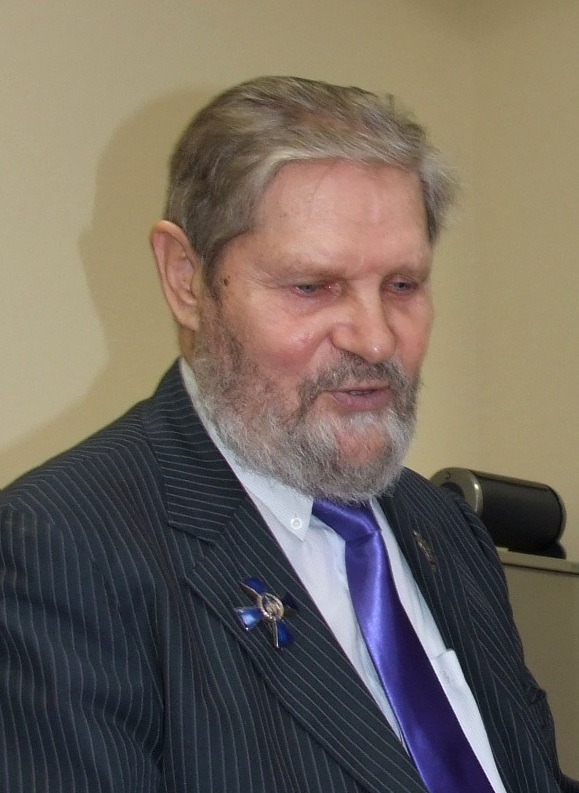
- Born: 28 March 1939 (age 87); Moscow
- Occupation: Geographer

Alexey Vladimirovich Postnikov (Russian: Алексе́й Влади́мирович По́стников; born 28 March 1939) is an internationally known specialist on the History of Science, with particular emphasis on the geography and cartography of Russia and these countries that have been under Russian influence from the 17th through the 20th centuries.

He analyzed the development of Earth Sciences and Cartography in a broad social-cultural context. It reveals the limitation of Eurocentric approach by including the rich traditions of old Asian and American countries and people, as well as historical processes of their interaction and mutual influences with European geographical practices and theories. His work Mapping of Russian America: A History of Russian–American Contacts in Cartography is the most representative examples of this. Besides that fundamental monograph, the article Learning from Each Other – a History of Russian-native contacts in late Eighteenth - early Nineteenth Century Exploration and Mapping of Alaska and the Aleutian Islands in the International Hydrographic Review may be mentioned in this connection, whiсh deals with Native Americans' geographical data's use by Russian in Alaska and Aleutian Island.

In addition to their value as fundamental research on the development of cosmographical and geographical ideas and methods in different periods of the human history, Prof. Postnikov's studies in the History of Science, are important research tools for historical geographers who deal with detailed studies of territorial aspects of changes in nature and society.

== Biography ==
Born in Moscow in 1939 in the family of a diplomat (father Vladimir M. Konstantinov) and a military doctor (mother Maria A. Postnikova). Alexey Postnikov was graduated with a degree in geodesy from Moscow Institute of Engineers of Geodesy (the faculty of Air Surveying and Cartography) in 1965. From 1965 Alexey Postnikov was a research fellow aboard of the exploring ship "Bataysk", in 1967 he obtained the post of editor and author of historical Maps for the Soviet Atlas of World History and Atlas of the History of the USSR. From 1974 till 1977 he was a member of chief administration of geodesy and cartography of the Soviet of Ministers of the USSR.

His academic career in the Soviet Academy of Sciences was in 1972 when Alexei Postnikov was employed in the Institute of Russian History as a junior researcher. In 1980 Postnikov began his work in the Institute for the History of Science and Technology named after S.I. Vavilov, first as a researcher and finally as director.

Nowadays Prof. Postnikov is working as a chief researcher at the Institute for the History of Science and Technology named after S.I. Vavilov Russian Academy of Sciences, a director of Imago Mundi International Journal on the History of Cartography, the expert at Harley Fellowships, co-editor of the collective monography The History of Cartography, ex-director of Roerich's fund.

== Main publications ==
Alexey Postnikov published more than 200 works, including fourteen books (ten in Russian, two in English, one in Pushtu, and one in Russian and in English).

Russia in Maps: a History of the Geographical Study and Cartography of the Country. Moscow: Nash Dom L’Age d’Homme, 1996.

Mapping of Russian America: A History of Russian–American Contacts in Cartography. American Geographical Society Collection Special Publication. No. 4. (Milwaukee), 1995.

Karpinskii Collection Checklist. Compiled by Alexey Postnikov. Provisional draft, September 1994, Newberry Library. Chicago, 1994.

The Emergence of the Russian Topographical Service and Cartography as seen through Manuals and Instructions: the Eighteenth – early Nineteenth Century (up to 1812). Development of Ideas and Methods in Cartography: Materials of the Commission Meeting in Kaliningrad (August 2006) / Ed.: Chair, ICA Commission on History of Cartography, Prof. Dr. Alexey Postnikov; Language Eds: Dr. Irina Sirotkina, Dr. Roger Smith. M.: OOO INFOKOR, 2006.

The Study and Mapping of the Rivers of European Russia in the First Half of the 18th Century. VI International Conference on the History of Cartography: Summaries of Papers Offered for Presentation. Greenwich, England, 1975.

Exploring and Mapping Alaska. Russian America Era, 1741–1867. University of Alaska Press - Rasmuson Library Historic Translation. (Fairbanks, 2015) 450 pages, 75 maps. (co-authored with Marvin Falk, translated by Lydia Black).

== Awards ==
In 1987 the book The Development of Cartography and use of Old Maps was awarded the Golden Medal named N.M. Przewalski, which was one of the highest awards of the Geographical Society of the USSR for outstanding monographs in the fields of Cartography, Geomorphology and field surveys.

In 2003 the book Politicians, Spies, and Geographers in the Struggle for Pamir in the 19th Century, monograph in documents was awarded the Golden Medal named after P.P. Semenov of the Russian Geographical Society.

On 11 February 2004 Alexey Postnikov was honored with the State Decoration of "The Honorable Scientist of the Russian Federation"
