= Viktor Postnikov =

Russian ice hockey player

- Born: January 14, 1992 (age 33) Magnitogorsk, Russia
- Height: 6 ft 1 in (185 cm)
- Weight: 176 lb (80 kg; 12 st 8 lb)
- Position: Defence
- Shoots: Left
- VHL team Former teams: Yermak Angarsk; Avtomobilist Yekaterinburg; Metallurg Novokuznetsk; Metallurg Magnitogorsk; HK Poprad
- Playing career: 2013–present

Viktor Postnikov (born January 14, 1992) is a Russian professional ice hockey defenceman

Postnikov made his Kontinental Hockey League debut playing with Avtomobilist Yekaterinburg during the 2013–14 KHL season.
