= Postnikov square =

In algebraic topology, a Postnikov square is a certain cohomology operation from a first cohomology group H^{1} to a third cohomology group H^{3}, introduced by Postnikov (1949). Eilenberg (1952) described a generalization taking classes in H^{t} to H^{2t+1}.
