= Yakov Pesin =

Russian-American mathematician (born 1946)

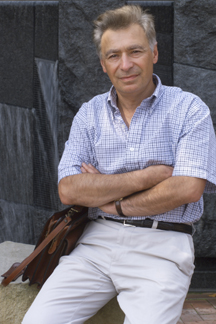
- Born: December 12, 1946 (age 79); Moscow, USSR (Russia)
- Education: Moscow State University
- Known for: Pesin theory
- Awards: Member of the European Academy – Academia Europaea; Fellow of the American Mathematical Society
- Scientific career
- Fields: Mathematics – Dynamical Systems
- Workplaces: Pennsylvania State University
- Doctoral advisor: Dmitry Anosov

Yakov Borisovich Pesin (Russian: Яков Борисович Песин) was born in Moscow, Russia (former USSR) on December 12, 1946. Pesin is currently a Distinguished Professor in the Department of Mathematics and the Director of the Anatole Katok Center for Dynamical Systems and Geometry at the Pennsylvania State University (PSU). His primary areas of research are the theory of dynamical systems with an emphasis on smooth ergodic theory, dimension theory in dynamical systems, and Riemannian geometry, as well as mathematical and statistical physics.

== Professional life and education ==
Pesin became interested in mathematics in school but his real involvement began when he entered the boarding school with emphasis on teaching physics and mathematics that was organized by Andrei Kolmogorov. Following his graduation of the school (with honors) in 1965, he successfully passed entry exams to the Department of Mechanics and Mathematics (or "Mech-Mat") of Moscow State University. Pesin graduated from Moscow State University (also with honors) in 1970, receiving a master's degree in mathematics. His master thesis advisor was Yakov Sinai.

Pesin naturally wanted to pursue a PhD in mathematics but faced significant challenges due to the oppressive nature and anti-Semitic policies of the Soviet regime. Thus, he was not permitted to continue his study at the university graduate school and was subsequently assigned to work at a research institute in Moscow (for a more complete historical account of the anti-Semitic sentiment in the Soviet mathematics establishment during this period see Antisemitism in Soviet mathematics).

Since Pesin always dreamed to be a "pure" mathematician, under the circumstances, he chose to combine his work at the institute with his after-hours research in mathematics and within a few years after graduation, he made a number of outstanding breakthroughs in the theory of smooth dynamical systems. His research at this time was conducted under the supervision of his PhD advisor, Dmitry Anosov, and also Anatole Katok.

In 1989 Pesin immigrated to the United States with his family. He first worked as a visiting Professor in the Department of Mathematics at the University of Chicago before getting the position of Full Professor at Penn State University. In 2003 Pesin received the title of Distinguished Professor of mathematics.

Yakov Pesin is married to Natasha Pesin who while in Russia worked for several years as a senior editor in the division of mathematics at the "Prosvechenie" ("Education") Publishing House in Moscow. After moving to the US she started a new career as a ceramicist.

Yakov Pesin also has two daughters, Elena and Irina who reside in the US.

== Research accomplishments ==
Yakov Pesin is famous for several fundamental discoveries in the theory of dynamical systems (relevant references can be found on Pesin's website).

1) In a joint work with Michael Brin "Flows of frames on manifolds of negative curvature" (Russian Math. Surveys, 1973), Pesin laid down the foundations of partial hyperbolicity theory. As an application, they studied ergodic properties of the frame flows on manifolds of negative curvature. In a later work with Yakov Sinai "Gibbs measures for partially hyperbolic attractors" (Ergodic Theory and Dynamical Systems, 1983) Pesin constructed a special class of u-measures for partially hyperbolic systems which are a direct analog in this setting of the famous Sinai-Ruelle-Bowen (SRB) measures.

2) Pesin's greatest contribution to dynamics is creation of non-uniform hyperbolicity theory, which is commonly known as Pesin Theory. This theory serves as the mathematical foundation for the principal phenomenon known as "deterministic chaos" – the appearance of highly irregular chaotic motions in completely deterministic dynamical systems. Among the highlights of this theory is the formula for the Kolmogorov-Sinai entropy of the system (also known as Pesin entropy formula). His main article on this topic "Characteristic Lyapunov exponents and smooth ergodic theory" (Russian Mathematical Surveys, 1977) has a very high number of citations in mathematical literature and beyond (in physics, biology, etc.).

3) Pesin's later work on non-uniform hyperbolicity includes establishing presence of systems with non-zero Lyapunov exponents on any manifold; a proof of the Eckmann—Ruelle conjecture; the study of the essential coexistence phenomenon of regular and chaotic dynamics; constructions of SRB measures for hyperbolic attractors with singularities, partially hyperbolic and non-uniformly hyperbolic attractors; and effecting thermodynamic formalism for some classes of non-uniformly hyperbolic dynamical systems.

4) Pesin designed a construction (known also as the Caratheodory-Pesin construction) that allows one to introduce and study various dimension-type characteristics of dynamical systems. Among other things his work reveals "dimension nature" of many of the well-known thermodynamics invariants such as metric and topological entropies and topological pressure. It also provides a unified approach to describe various dimension spectra and related multi-fractal formalism (see).

5) Pesin's work in Mathematical Physics includes the study of Coupled Map Lattices associated with infinite chains of hyperbolic systems as well as the ones generated by some diffusion-type PDEs such as FitzHu-Nagumo and Belousov-Zhabotinsky equations.

== Teaching ==
Yakov Pesin holds a tenured faculty position at the Pennsylvania State University, where he has advised numerous PhD students on their thesis. In addition to his regular teaching responsibilities, he designed and taught courses at the special MASS (Mathematics Advanced Study Semester) program on Dynamical Systems and Analytic and Projective Geometry. He has also delivered mini-courses at numerous International Mathematical Schools.

== Honors and recognition ==
In 1986 Yakov Pesin was invited to speak at the International Congress of Mathematicians (ICM) in Berkeley, CA, but Soviet authorities did not allow him to travel to the US. Nevertheless, his talk on "Ergodic properties and dimension-like characteristics of strange attractors that are close to hyperbolic" was published in the proceedings of the ICM in 1987.

In 2012 Yakov Pesin became a Fellow of the American Mathematical Society (in its inaugural class) and in 2019 he was elected a (foreign) member of the European Academy—Academia Europaea. He was elected to the American Academy of Arts and Sciences in 2023.

Yakov Pesin was invited to give many distinguished lectures including Invited Address at SIAM Annual Meeting (Kansas City, 1996), Invited Address, at the AMS Annual Meeting (Ohio State University, 2001), and Bernoulli Lecture at the Centre Interfacultaire Bernoulli, Ecole Polytechnique Federale de Lausanne, Switzerland (2013).
