= Peixoto's theorem =

Theorem in dynamical systems theory

In the theory of dynamical systems, Peixoto's theorem, proved by Maurício Peixoto, states that among all smooth flows on surfaces, i.e. compact two-dimensional manifolds, structurally stable systems may be characterized by the following properties:

- The set of non-wandering points consists only of periodic orbits and fixed points.
- The set of fixed points is finite and consists only of hyperbolic equilibrium points.
- Finiteness of attracting or repelling periodic orbits.
- Absence of saddle-to-saddle connections.

Moreover, they form an open set in the space of all flows endowed with the C^{1} topology.

== See also ==
- Andronov–Pontryagin criterion
