= Dual Steenrod algebra =

In algebraic topology, through an algebraic operation (dualization), there is an associated commutative algebra from the noncommutative Steenrod algebras called the dual Steenrod algebra. This dual algebra has a number of surprising benefits, such as being commutative and provided technical tools for computing the Adams spectral sequence in many cases (such as $\pi_*(MU)$) with much ease.

== Definition ==
Recall that the Steenrod algebra $\mathcal{A}_p^*$ (also denoted $\mathcal{A}^*$) is a graded noncommutative Hopf algebra which is cocommutative, meaning its comultiplication is cocommutative. This implies if we take the dual Hopf algebra, denoted $\mathcal{A}_{p,*}$, or just $\mathcal{A}_*$, then this gives a graded-commutative algebra which has a noncommutative comultiplication. We can summarize this duality through dualizing a commutative diagram of the Steenrod's Hopf algebra structure:

$\mathcal{A}_p^* \xrightarrow{\psi^*} \mathcal{A}_p^* \otimes \mathcal{A}_p^* \xrightarrow{\phi^*} \mathcal{A}_p^*$

If we dualize we get maps

$\mathcal{A}_{p,*} \xleftarrow{\psi_*} \mathcal{A}_{p,*} \otimes \mathcal{A}_{p,*}\xleftarrow{\phi_*} \mathcal{A}_{p,*}$

giving the main structure maps for the dual Hopf algebra. It turns out there's a nice structure theorem for the dual Hopf algebra, separated by whether the prime is $2$ or odd.

=== Case of p=2 ===
In this case, the dual Steenrod algebra is a graded commutative polynomial algebra $\mathcal{A}_* = \mathbb{Z}/2[\xi_1,\xi_2,\ldots]$ where the degree $\deg(\xi_n) = 2^n-1$. Then, the coproduct map is given by

$\Delta:\mathcal{A}_* \to \mathcal{A}_*\otimes\mathcal{A}_*$

sending

$\Delta\xi_n = \sum_{0 \leq i \leq n} \xi_{n-i}^{2^i}\otimes \xi_i$

where $\xi_0 = 1$.

=== General case of p > 2 ===
For all other prime numbers, the dual Steenrod algebra is slightly more complex and involves a graded-commutative exterior algebra in addition to a graded-commutative polynomial algebra. If we let $\Lambda(x,y)$ denote an exterior algebra over $\mathbb{Z}/p$ with generators $x$ and $y$, then the dual Steenrod algebra has the presentation

$\mathcal{A}_* = \mathbb{Z}/p[\xi_1,\xi_2,\ldots]\otimes \Lambda(\tau_0,\tau_1,\ldots)$

where

$$\begin{align}
\deg(\xi_n) &= 2(p^n - 1) \\
\deg(\tau_n) &= 2p^n - 1
\end{align}$$

In addition, it has the comultiplication $\Delta:\mathcal{A}_* \to \mathcal{A}_*\otimes\mathcal{A}_*$ defined by

$$\begin{align}
\Delta(\xi_n) &= \sum_{0 \leq i \leq n} \xi_{n-i}^{p^i}\otimes \xi_i \\
\Delta(\tau_n) &= \tau_n\otimes 1 + \sum_{0 \leq i \leq n}\xi_{n-i}^{p^i}\otimes \tau_i
\end{align}$$

where again $\xi_0 = 1$.

=== Rest of Hopf algebra structure in both cases ===
The rest of the Hopf algebra structures can be described exactly the same in both cases. There is both a unit map $\eta$ and counit map $\varepsilon$

$$\begin{align}
\eta&: \mathbb{Z}/p \to \mathcal{A}_* \\
\varepsilon&: \mathcal{A}_* \to \mathbb{Z}/p
\end{align}$$

which are both isomorphisms in degree $0$: these come from the original Steenrod algebra. In addition, there is also a conjugation map $c: \mathcal{A}_* \to \mathcal{A}_*$ defined recursively by the equations

$$\begin{align}
c(\xi_0) &= 1 \\
\sum_{0 \leq i \leq n} \xi_{n-i}^{p^i}c(\xi_i)& = 0
\end{align}$$

In addition, we will denote $\overline{\mathcal{A}_*}$ as the kernel of the counit map $\varepsilon$ which is isomorphic to $\mathcal{A}_*$ in degrees $> 1$.

== See also ==
- Adams-Novikov spectral sequence
