= Mikhail Postnikov =

Soviet mathematician (1927–2004)

- Born: 27 October 1927; Shatura, Soviet Union
- Died: 27 May 2004 (aged 76); Moscow, Russia
- Education: Moscow State University
- Known for: Postnikov system Postnikov square
- Scientific career
- Fields: Mathematics
- Workplaces: Moscow State University
- Doctoral advisor: Lev Pontryagin
- Doctoral students: Sergei Novikov; Yuli Rudyak; Andrei Bolibrukh

Mikhail Mikhailovich Postnikov (Russian: Михаи́л Миха́йлович По́стников; 27 October 1927 – 27 May 2004) was a Soviet mathematician, known for his work in algebraic and differential topology.

== Biography ==
He was born in Shatura, near Moscow. He received his Ph.D. from Moscow State University under the direction of Lev Pontryagin, and then became a professor at this university. He died in Moscow.

== Selected publications ==
- Fundamentals of Galois theory, 1961; 142 pp. Dover reprint, 2004
- The variational theory of geodesics, Translated from the Russian by Scripta Technica, Inc. Edited by Bernard Russell Gelbaum. Saunders, Philadelphia, Pa., 1967; 200 pp.
- Linear algebra and differential geometry. Translated from the Russian by Vladimir Shokurov. Mir Publishers, 1982; 319 pp.
- Smooth manifolds, Mir Publishers, 1989; 511 pp.
- Geometry VI: Riemannian Geometry, Springer, 2001, 504 pp.

=== French ===
- Leçons de géométrie : Semestre I : Géométrie analytique, Éditions Mir, 1981; 279 pp.
- Leçons de géométrie : Semestre II : Algèbre linéaire et géométrie différentielle, Éditions Mir, 1981; 263 pp.
- Leçons de géométrie : Semestre III : Variétés différentiables, Éditions Mir, 1990; 431 pp.
- Leçons de géométrie : Semestre IV : Géométrie différentielle, Éditions Mir, 1990; 439 pp.
- Leçons de géométrie : Semestre V : Groupes et algèbres de Lie, Éditions Mir, 1985; 374 pp.

== See also ==
- Postnikov system
- Postnikov square

== Bibliography ==
- O'Connor, John J.; Robertson, Edmund F., "Mikhail Mikhailovich Postnikov", MacTutor History of Mathematics Archive, University of St Andrews
- Postnikov, M. M. (1993), "Pages of a mathematical autobiography (1942--1953)", in Zdravkovska, Smilka; Duren, Peter L. (eds.), Golden years of Moscow mathematics, Hist. Math., vol. 6, Providence, R.I.: American Mathematical Society, pp. 155–178, ISBN 978-0-8218-9003-5, MR 1246563
- Rudyak, Yuli (2009), "M. M. Postnikov: his life, work and legacy", Algebraic topology---old and new, Banach Center Publications, vol. 85, Polish Acad. Sci. Inst. Math., Warsaw, pp. 15–29, doi:10.4064/bc85-0-1, ISBN 978-83-86806-04-1, MR 2503515
