= Lev Pontryagin =

Soviet mathematician (1908–1988)

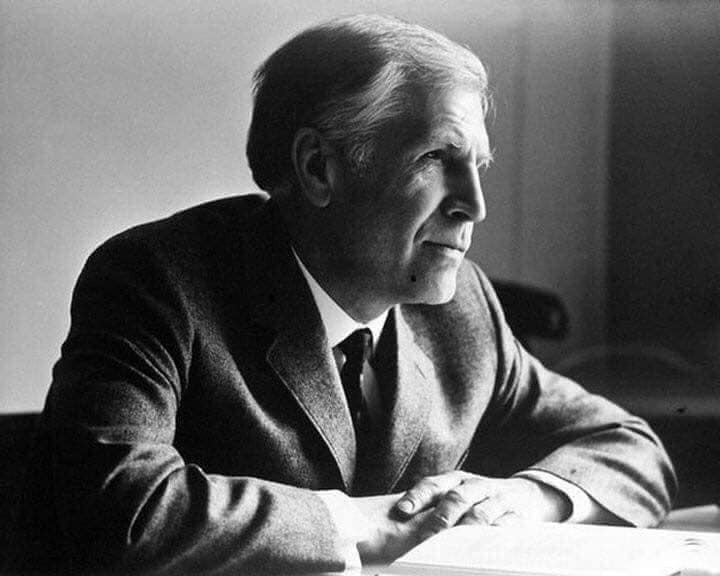
- Pontryagin in c. 1950s
- Born: 3 September 1908; Moscow, Russian Empire
- Died: 3 May 1988 (aged 79); Moscow, Soviet Union
- Known for: Pontryagin duality Pontryagin class Pontryagin cohomology operation Pontryagin's maximum principle Andronov–Pontryagin criterion
- Scientific career
- Fields: Mathematics
- Doctoral advisor: Pavel Alexandrov
- Doctoral students: Dmitri Anosov; Vladimir Boltyansky; Revaz Gamkrelidze; Mikhail Postnikov; Mikhail Zelikin

Lev Semyonovich Pontryagin (Russian: Лев Семёнович Понтрягин, also written Pontriagin or Pontrjagin, first name sometimes anglicized as Leon) (3 September 1908 – 3 May 1988) was a Soviet mathematician. Completely blind from the age of 14, he made major discoveries in a number of fields of mathematics, including algebraic topology, differential topology and optimal control.

== Early life and career ==
Pontryagin was born in Moscow and lost his eyesight completely due to an unsuccessful eye surgery after a primus stove explosion when he was 14. His mother Tatyana Andreyevna, who did not know mathematical symbols, read mathematical books and papers (notably those of Heinz Hopf, J. H. C. Whitehead, and Hassler Whitney) to him, and later worked as his secretary. His mother used alternative names for math symbols, such as "tails up" for the set-union symbol $\cup$.

In 1925 he entered Moscow State University, where he was strongly influenced by the lectures of Pavel Alexandrov who would become his doctoral thesis advisor. After graduating in 1929, he obtained a position at Moscow State University. In 1934 he joined the Steklov Institute in Moscow. In 1970 he became vice president of the International Mathematical Union.

== Work ==
Pontryagin worked on duality theory for homology while still a student. He went on to lay foundations for the abstract theory of the Fourier transform, now called Pontryagin duality. Using these tools, he was able to solve the case of Hilbert's fifth problem for abelian groups in 1934.

In 1935, he was able to compute the homology groups of the classical compact Lie groups, which he would later call his greatest achievement.

With René Thom, he is regarded as one of the co-founders of cobordism theory, and co-discoverers of the central idea of this theory, that framed cobordism and stable homotopy are equivalent. This led to the introduction around 1940 of a theory of certain characteristic classes, now called Pontryagin classes, designed to vanish on a manifold that is a boundary.

In 1942 he introduced the cohomology operations now called Pontryagin squares. Moreover, in operator theory there are specific instances of Krein spaces called Pontryagin spaces.

Starting in 1952, he worked in optimal control theory. His maximum principle is fundamental to the modern theory of optimization. He also introduced the idea of a bang–bang principle, to describe situations where the applied control at each moment is either the maximum positive 'steer', or the maximum negative 'steer'.

Pontryagin authored several influential monographs as well as popular textbooks in mathematics.

Pontryagin's students include Dmitri Anosov, Vladimir Boltyansky, Revaz Gamkrelidze, Yevgeny Mishchenko, Mikhail Postnikov, Vladimir Rokhlin, and Mikhail Zelikin.

== Controversy and antisemitism allegations ==
Pontryagin participated in a few notorious political campaigns in the Soviet Union. In 1930, he and several other young members of the Moscow Mathematical Society publicly denounced as counter-revolutionary the Society's head Dmitri Egorov, who openly supported the Russian Orthodox Church and had recently been arrested. They then proceeded to follow their plan of reorganizing the Society.

Pontryagin was accused of anti-Semitism on several occasions. For example, he attacked Nathan Jacobson for being a "mediocre scientist" representing the "Zionism movement", while both men were vice-presidents of the International Mathematical Union. When a prominent Soviet Jewish mathematician, Grigory Margulis, was selected by the IMU to receive the Fields Medal at the upcoming 1978 ICM, Pontryagin, who was a member of the executive committee of the IMU at the time, vigorously objected. Although the IMU stood by its decision to award Margulis the Fields Medal, Margulis was denied a Soviet exit visa by the Soviet authorities and was unable to attend the 1978 ICM in person.

Pontryagin rejected charges of antisemitism in an article published in Science in 1979. In his memoirs Pontryagin claims that he struggled with Zionism, which he considered a form of racism.

== Publications ==
- Pontrjagin, L. (1939), Topological Groups, Princeton Mathematical Series, vol. 2, Princeton: Princeton University Press, MR 0000265 (translated by Emma Lehmer)
- 1952 - Foundations of Combinatorial Topology (translated from 1947 original Russian edition) 2015 Dover reprint
- 1962 - Ordinary Differential Equations (translated from Russian by Leonas Kacinskas and Walter B. Counts)
  - Pontryagin, L. S. (15 May 2014). Ordinary Differential Equations: Adiwes International Series in Mathematics. Elsevier. ISBN 9781483156491.
- 1962 - with Vladimir Boltyansky, Revaz Gamkrelidze, and Evgenii Mishchenko: The Mathematical Theory of Optimal Processes

== See also ==
- Andronov–Pontryagin criterion for planar dynamical systems
- Kuratowski's theorem, also called the Pontryagin–Kuratowski theorem, on planar graphs
- Pontryagin class
- Pontryagin duality
- Pontryagin's maximum principle
