= Connective spectrum =

Spectrum with a negative homotopy of zero

In algebraic topology, a branch of mathematics, a connective spectrum is a spectrum whose homotopy sets $\pi_k$ of negative degrees are zero.
