= Steenrod algebra =

Algebra in algebraic topology

In algebraic topology, a Steenrod algebra was defined by Henri Cartan (1955) to be the algebra of stable cohomology operations for mod $p$ cohomology.

For a given prime number $p$, the Steenrod algebra $A_p$ is the graded Hopf algebra over the field $\mathbb{F}_p$ of order $p$, consisting of all stable cohomology operations for mod $p$ cohomology. It is generated by the Steenrod squares introduced by Norman Steenrod (1947) for $p=2$, and by the Steenrod reduced $p$th powers introduced in Steenrod (1953a, 1953b) and the Bockstein homomorphism for $p>2$.

The term "Steenrod algebra" is also sometimes used for the algebra of cohomology operations of a generalized cohomology theory.

== Cohomology operations ==
A cohomology operation is a natural transformation between cohomology functors. For example, if we take cohomology with coefficients in a ring $R$, the cup product squaring operation yields a family of cohomology operations:

$$H^n(X;R) \to H^{2n}(X;R)$$
$$x \mapsto x \smile x.$$

Cohomology operations need not be homomorphisms of graded rings; see the Cartan formula below.

These operations do not commute with suspension—that is, they are unstable. (This is because if $Y$ is a suspension of a space $X$, the cup product on the cohomology of $Y$ is trivial.) Steenrod constructed stable operations

$$Sq^i \colon H^n(X;\Z /2) \to H^{n+i}(X;\Z /2)$$

for all $i$ greater than zero. The notation $Sq$ and their name, the Steenrod squares, comes from the fact that $Sq^n$ restricted to classes of degree $n$ is the cup square. There are analogous operations for odd primary coefficients, usually denoted $P^i$ and called the reduced $p$-th power operations:

$$P^i \colon H^n(X;\Z /p) \to H^{n+2i(p-1)}(X;\Z /p)$$

The $Sq^i$ generate a connected graded algebra over $\Z /2$, where the multiplication is given by composition of operations. This is the mod 2 Steenrod algebra. In the case $p > 2$, the mod $p$ Steenrod algebra is generated by the $P^i$ and the Bockstein operation $\beta$ associated to the short exact sequence

$$0 \to \Z /p \to \Z /p^2 \to \Z /p \to 0$$.

In the case $p=2$, the Bockstein element is $Sq^1$ and the reduced $p$-th power $P^i$ is $Sq^{2 i}$.

=== As a cohomology ring ===
We can summarize the properties of the Steenrod operations as generators in the cohomology ring of Eilenberg–Maclane spectra

$$\mathcal{A}_p = H\mathbb{F}_p^*(H\mathbb{F}_p)$$,

since there is an isomorphism

$$\begin{align}
H\mathbb{F}_p^*(H\mathbb{F}_p) &= \bigoplus_{k=0}^\infty
\underset{\leftarrow n}{\text{lim}}\left(
H^{n+k}(K(\mathbb{F}_p,n); \mathbb{F}_p)
\right)
\end{align}$$

giving a direct sum decomposition of all possible cohomology operations with coefficients in $\mathbb{F}_p$. Note the inverse limit of cohomology groups appears because it is a computation in the stable range of cohomology groups of Eilenberg–Maclane spaces. This result was originally computed by Cartan (1954–1955, p. 7) and Serre (1953).

Note there is a dual characterization using homology for the dual Steenrod algebra.

==== Remark about generalizing to generalized cohomology theories ====
It should be observed if the Eilenberg–Maclane spectrum $H\mathbb{F}_p$ is replaced by an arbitrary spectrum $E$, then there are many challenges for studying the cohomology ring $E^*(E)$. In this case, the generalized dual Steenrod algebra $E_*(E)$ should be considered instead because it has much better properties and can be tractably studied in many cases (such as $KO, KU, MO, MU, MSp, \mathbb{S}, H\mathbb{F}_p$). In fact, these ring spectra are commutative and the $\pi_*(E)$ bimodules $E_*(E)$ are flat. In this case, these is a canonical coaction of $E_*(E)$ on $E_*(X)$ for any space $X$, such that this action behaves well with respect to the stable homotopy category, i.e., there is an isomorphism
$$E_*(E)\otimes_{\pi_*(E)}E_*(X) \to [ \mathbb{S}, E\wedge E \wedge X]_*$$
hence we can use the unit the ring spectrum $E$
$$\eta:\mathbb{S} \to E$$
to get a coaction of $E_*(E)$ on $E_*(X)$.

== Axiomatic characterization ==
Norman Steenrod and David B. A. Epstein (1962) showed that the Steenrod squares $Sq^n\colon H^m \to H^{m+n}$ are characterized by the following 5 axioms:

1. Naturality: $Sq^n \colon H^m(X;\Z /2) \to H^{m+n}(X;\Z /2)$ is an additive homomorphism and is natural with respect to any $f\colon X\to Y$, so $f^*(Sq^n(x)) = Sq^n(f^*(x))$.
2. $Sq^0$ is the identity homomorphism.
3. $Sq^n(x) = x \smile x$ for $x \in H^n(X;\Z /2)$.
4. If $n> \deg(x)$ then $Sq^n(x) = 0$
5. Cartan Formula: $Sq^n(x \smile y) = \sum_{i+j=n} (Sq^i x) \smile (Sq^j y)$

In addition the Steenrod squares have the following properties:

- $Sq^1$ is the Bockstein homomorphism $\beta$ of the exact sequence $0 \to \Z/2 \to \Z/4 \to \Z/2 \to 0.$
- $Sq^i$ commutes with the connecting morphism of the long exact sequence in cohomology. In particular, it commutes with respect to suspension $H^k(X;\Z /2) \cong H^{k+1}(\Sigma X;\Z /2)$
- They satisfy the Adem relations, described below

Similarly the following axioms characterize the reduced $p$-th powers for $p > 2$.

1. Naturality: $P^n\colon H^m(X,\Z /p\Z ) \to H^{m+2n(p-1)}(X,\Z /p\Z )$ is an additive homomorphism and natural.
2. $P^0$ is the identity homomorphism.
3. $P^n$ is the cup $p$-th power on classes of degree $2n$.
4. If $2n > \deg(x)$ then $P^n(x) = 0$
5. Cartan Formula: $P^n(x \smile y) = \sum_{i+j=n} (P^i x) \smile (P^j y)$

As before, the reduced p-th powers also satisfy the Adem relations and commute with the suspension and boundary operators.

== Adem relations ==
The Adem relations for $p=2$ were conjectured by Wen-tsün Wu (1952) and established by José Adem (1952). They are given by

$$Sq^i Sq^j = \sum_{k=0}^{\lfloor i/2 \rfloor} {j-k-1 \choose i-2k} Sq^{i+j-k} Sq^k$$

for all $i,j>0$ such that $i< 2j$. (The binomial coefficients are to be interpreted mod 2.) The Adem relations allow one to write an arbitrary composition of Steenrod squares as a sum of Serre–Cartan basis elements.

For odd $p$ the Adem relations are

$$P^{a}P^{b} = \sum_i (-1)^{a+i}{(p-1)(b-i)-1 \choose a-pi} P^{a+b-i}P^i$$

for a<pb and

$$P^{a}\beta P^{b} = \sum_i (-1)^{a+i}{(p-1)(b-i) \choose a-pi} \beta P^{a+b-i}P^i+
\sum_i (-1)^{a+i+1}{(p-1)(b-i)-1 \choose a-pi-1} P^{a+b-i}\beta P^i$$

for $a\le pb$.

=== Bullett–Macdonald identities ===
Shaun R. Bullett and Ian G. Macdonald (1982) reformulated the Adem relations as the following identities.

For $p=2$ put

$$P(t)=\sum_{i\geq 0}t^i\text{Sq}^i$$

then the Adem relations are equivalent to

$$P(s^2+st)\cdot P(t^2)=P(t^2+st)\cdot P(s^2)$$

For $p > 2$ put

$$P(t)=\sum_{i\geq 0}t^i\text{P}^i$$

then the Adem relations are equivalent to the statement that

$$(1+s\operatorname{Ad} \beta)P(t^p+t^{p-1}s+\cdots+ts^{p-1})P(s^p)$$

is symmetric in $s$ and $t$. Here $\beta$ is the Bockstein operation and $(\operatorname{Ad} \beta) P = \beta P - P\beta$.

== Geometric interpretation ==
There is a nice straightforward geometric interpretation of the Steenrod squares using manifolds representing cohomology classes. Suppose $X$ is a smooth manifold and consider a cohomology class $\alpha \in H^*(X)$ represented geometrically as a smooth submanifold $f\colon Y \hookrightarrow X$. Cohomologically, if we let $1 = [Y] \in H^0(Y)$ represent the fundamental class of $Y$ then the pushforward map

$$f_*(1) = \alpha$$

gives a representation of $\alpha$. Let $\nu_{Y/X} \to Y$ be the associated Normal bundle to this immersion. The Steenrod squares of $\alpha$ can now be understood — they are the pushforward of the Stiefel–Whitney class of the normal bundle

$$Sq^i(\alpha) = f_*(w_i(\nu_{Y/X})),$$

which gives a geometric reason for why the Steenrod products eventually vanish. Note that because the Steenrod maps are group homomorphisms, if we have a class $\beta$ which can be represented as a sum

$$\beta = \alpha_1+ \cdots + \alpha_n,$$

where the $\alpha_k$ are represented as manifolds, we can interpret the squares of the classes as sums of the pushforwards of the normal bundles of their underlying smooth manifolds, i.e.,

$$Sq^i(\beta) = \sum_{k=1}^n f_*(w_i(\nu_{Y_k/X})).$$

Also, this equivalence is strongly related to the Wu formula.

== Computations ==
=== Complex projective spaces ===
On the complex projective plane $\mathbf{CP}^2$, there are only the following non-trivial cohomology groups,

$$H^0(\mathbf{CP}^2) \cong H^2(\mathbf{CP}^2) \cong H^4(\mathbf{CP}^2) \cong \Z$$,

as can be computed using a cellular decomposition. This implies that the only possible non-trivial Steenrod product is $Sq^2$ on $H^2(\mathbf{CP}^2;\Z/2)$ since it gives the cup product on cohomology. As the cup product structure on $H^\ast(\mathbf{CP}^2;\Z/2)$ is nontrivial, this square is nontrivial. There is a similar computation on the complex projective space $\mathbf{CP}^6$, where the only non-trivial squares are $Sq^0$ and the squaring operations $Sq^{2i}$ on the cohomology groups $H^{2i}$ representing the cup product. In $\mathbf{CP}^8$ the square

$$Sq^2\colon H^4(\mathbf{CP}^8;\Z/2) \to H^6(\mathbf{CP}^8;\Z/2)$$

can be computed using the geometric techniques outlined above and the relation between Chern classes and Stiefel–Whitney classes; note that $f\colon \mathbf{CP}^4 \hookrightarrow \mathbf{CP}^8$ represents the non-zero class in $H^4(\mathbf{CP}^8;\Z/2)$. It can also be computed directly using the Cartan formula since $x^2 \in H^4(\mathbf{CP}^8)$ and

$$\begin{align}
Sq^2(x^2) &= Sq^0(x)\smile Sq^2(x) + Sq^1(x)\smile Sq^1(x) + Sq^2(x)\smile Sq^0(x) \\
&= 0.
\end{align}$$

=== Infinite Real Projective Space ===
The Steenrod operations for real projective spaces can be readily computed using the formal properties of the Steenrod squares. Recall that

$$H^*(\mathbb{RP}^\infty;\Z /2) \cong \Z /2[x],$$

where $\deg(x) = 1.$ For the operations on $H^1$ we know that

$$\begin{align}
Sq^0(x) &= x \\
Sq^1(x) &= x^2 \\
Sq^k(x) &= 0 && \text{ for any } k>1
\end{align}$$

The Cartan relation implies that the total square

$$Sq := Sq^0 + Sq^1 + Sq^2 + \cdots$$

is a ring homomorphism

$$Sq\colon H^*(X) \to H^*(X).$$

Hence

$$Sq(x^n) = (Sq(x))^n = (x + x^2)^n = \sum_{i=0}^n {n \choose i} x^{n+i}$$

Since there is only one degree $n+i$ component of the previous sum, we have that

$$Sq^i(x^n) = {n \choose i}x^{n+i}.$$

== Construction ==
Suppose that $\pi$ is any degree $n$ subgroup of the symmetric group on $n$ points, $u$ a cohomology class in $H^q(X,B)$, $A$ an abelian group acted on by $\pi$, and $c$ a cohomology class in $H_i(\pi,A)$. Steenrod (1953a, 1953b) showed how to construct a reduced power $u^n/c$ in $H^{nq-i}(X, (A \otimes B \otimes \cdots \otimes B)/\pi)$, as follows.

1. Taking the external product of $u$ with itself $n$ times gives an equivariant cocycle on $X^n$ with coefficients in $B \otimes \cdots \otimes B$.
2. Choose $E$ to be a contractible space on which $\pi$ acts freely and an equivariant map from $E \times X$ to $X^n.$ Pulling back $u^n$ by this map gives an equivariant cocycle on $E \times X$ and therefore a cocycle of $E/\pi \times X$ with coefficients in $B \otimes \cdots \otimes B$.
3. Taking the slant product with $c$ in $H_i(E/\pi, A)$ gives a cocycle of $X$ with coefficients in $H_0(\pi, A \otimes B \otimes \cdots \otimes B)$.

The Steenrod squares and reduced powers are special cases of this construction where $\pi$ is a cyclic group of prime order $p=n$ acting as a cyclic permutation of $n$ elements, and the groups $A$ and $B$ are cyclic of order $p$, so that $H_0(\pi, A \otimes B \otimes \cdots \otimes B)$ is also cyclic of order $p$.

== Properties of the Steenrod algebra ==
In addition to the axiomatic structure the Steenrod algebra satisfies, it has a number of additional useful properties.

=== Basis for the Steenrod algebra ===
Jean-Pierre Serre (1953) (for $p=2$) and Henri Cartan (1954, 1955) (for $p>2$) described the structure of the Steenrod algebra of stable mod $p$ cohomology operations, showing that it is generated by the Bockstein homomorphism together with the Steenrod reduced powers, and the Adem relations generate the ideal of relations between these generators. In particular they found an explicit basis for the Steenrod algebra. This basis relies on a certain notion of admissibility for integer sequences. We say a sequence

$$i_1, i_2, \ldots, i_n$$

is admissible if for each $j$, we have that $i_j \ge 2i_{j+1}$. Then the elements

$$Sq^I = Sq^{i_1} \cdots Sq^{i_n},$$

where $I$ is an admissible sequence, form a basis (the Serre–Cartan basis) for the mod 2 Steenrod algebra, called the admissible basis. There is a similar basis for the case $p>2$ consisting of the elements

$$Sq_p^I = Sq_p^{i_1} \cdots Sq_p^{i_n}$$,

such that

$$i_j\ge pi_{j+1}$$
$$i_j\equiv 0,1\bmod 2(p-1)$$
$$Sq_p^{2k(p-1)} = P^k$$
$$Sq_p^{2k(p-1)+1} = \beta P^k$$

=== Hopf algebra structure and the Milnor basis ===
The Steenrod algebra has more structure than a graded $\mathbf{F}_p$-algebra. It is also a Hopf algebra, so that in particular there is a diagonal or comultiplication map

$$\psi \colon A \to A \otimes A$$

induced by the Cartan formula for the action of the Steenrod algebra on the cup product. This map is easier to describe than the product map, and is given by

$$\psi(Sq^k) = \sum_{i+j=k} Sq^i \otimes Sq^j$$

$$\psi(P^k) = \sum_{i+j=k} P^i \otimes P^j$$

$$\psi(\beta) = \beta\otimes1+1\otimes\beta$$.

These formulas imply that the Steenrod algebra is co-commutative.

The linear dual of $\psi$ makes the (graded) linear dual $A_*$ of A into an algebra. John Milnor (1958) proved, for $p = 2$, that $A_*$ is a polynomial algebra, with one generator $\xi_k$ of degree $2^k-1$, for every k, and for $p > 2$ the dual Steenrod algebra $A_*$ is the tensor product of the polynomial algebra in generators $\xi_k$ of degree $2p^k-2$ $(k\ge 1)$ and the exterior algebra in generators τ_{k} of degree $2p^k-1$ $(k\ge 0)$. The monomial basis for $A_*$ then gives another choice of basis for A, called the Milnor basis. The dual to the Steenrod algebra is often more convenient to work with, because the multiplication is (super) commutative. The comultiplication for $A_*$ is the dual of the product on A; it is given by

$\psi(\xi_n) = \sum_{i=0}^n \xi_{n-i}^{p^i} \otimes \xi_i.$ where $\xi_0=1$, and
$\psi(\tau_n) = \tau_n\otimes 1 + \sum_{i=0}^n \xi_{n-i}^{p^i} \otimes \tau_i$ if $p>2$.

The only primitive elements of $A_*$ for $p=2$ are the elements of the form $\xi_1^{2^i}$, and these are dual to the $Sq^{2^i}$ (the only indecomposables of A).

=== Relation to formal groups ===
The dual Steenrod algebras are supercommutative Hopf algebras, so their spectra are algebra supergroup schemes. These group schemes are closely related to the automorphisms of 1-dimensional additive formal groups. For example, if $p=2$ then the dual Steenrod algebra is the group scheme of automorphisms of the 1-dimensional additive formal group scheme $x+y$ that are the identity to first order. These automorphisms are of the form

$$x\rightarrow x + \xi_1x^2+\xi_2x^4+\xi_3x^8+\cdots$$

== Finite sub-Hopf algebras ==
The $p = 2$ Steenrod algebra admits a filtration by finite sub-Hopf algebras. As $\mathcal{A}_2$ is generated by the elements

$$Sq^{2^i}$$,

we can form subalgebras $\mathcal{A}_2(n)$ generated by the Steenrod squares

$$Sq^1, Sq^2, \ldots, Sq^{2^n}$$,

giving the filtration

$$\mathcal{A}_2(1) \subset \mathcal{A}_2(2) \subset \cdots \subset \mathcal{A}_2.$$

These algebras are significant because they can be used to simplify many Adams spectral sequence computations, such as for $\pi_*(ko)$, and $\pi_*(tmf)$.

== Algebraic construction ==
Larry Smith (2007) gave the following algebraic construction of the Steenrod algebra over a finite field $\mathbb{F}_q$ of order q. If V is a vector space over $\mathbb{F}_q$ then write SV for the symmetric algebra of V. There is an algebra homomorphism

$$\begin{cases} P(x)\colon SV[[x]]\to SV[[x]] \\ P(x)(v) = v+F(v)x=v+v^qx & v \in V \end{cases}$$

where F is the Frobenius endomorphism of SV. If we put

$$P(x)(f)=\sum P^i(f)x^i \qquad  p >2$$

or

$$P(x)(f)=\sum Sq^{2i}(f)x^i \qquad p =2$$

for $f\in SV$ then if V is infinite dimensional the elements $P^I$ generate an algebra isomorphism to the subalgebra of the Steenrod algebra generated by the reduced p′th powers for p odd, or the even Steenrod squares $Sq^{2i}$ for $p = 2$.

== Applications ==
Early applications of the Steenrod algebra were calculations by Jean-Pierre Serre of some homotopy groups of spheres, using the compatibility of transgressive differentials in the Serre spectral sequence with the Steenrod operations, and the classification by René Thom of smooth manifolds up to cobordism, through the identification of the graded ring of bordism classes with the homotopy groups of Thom complexes, in a stable range. The latter was refined to the case of oriented manifolds by C. T. C. Wall. A famous application of the Steenrod operations, involving factorizations through secondary cohomology operations associated to appropriate Adem relations, was the solution by J. Frank Adams of the Hopf invariant one problem. One application of the mod 2 Steenrod algebra that is fairly elementary is the following theorem.

Theorem. If there is a map $S^{2n-1}\to S^n$ of Hopf invariant one, then n is a power of 2.

The proof uses the fact that each $Sq^k$ is decomposable for k which is not a power of 2; that is, such an element is a product of squares of strictly smaller degree.

Michael A. Mandell gave a proof of the following theorem by studying the Steenrod algebra (with coefficients in the algebraic closure of $\mathbb{F}_p$):

Theorem. The singular cochain functor with coefficients in the algebraic closure of $\mathbb{F}_p$ induces a contravariant equivalence from the homotopy category of connected $p$-complete nilpotent spaces of finite $p$-type to a full subcategory of the homotopy category of [[$E_\infty$-algebras]] with coefficients in the algebraic closure of $\mathbb{F}_p$.

== Connection to the Adams spectral sequence and the homotopy groups of spheres ==
The cohomology of the Steenrod algebra is the $E_2$ term for the (p-local) Adams spectral sequence, whose abutment is the p-component of the stable homotopy groups of spheres. More specifically, the $E_2$ term of this spectral sequence may be identified as

$$\mathrm{Ext}^{s,t}_{A}(\mathbb{F}_p, \mathbb{F}_p).$$

This is what is meant by the aphorism "the cohomology of the Steenrod algebra is an approximation to the stable homotopy groups of spheres."

== See also ==
- Pontryagin cohomology operation
- Dual Steenrod algebra
- Cohomology operation
