= Bronshtein and Semendyayev =

Handbook of mathematics and table of formulas originating from Russia

Handbook of Mathematics
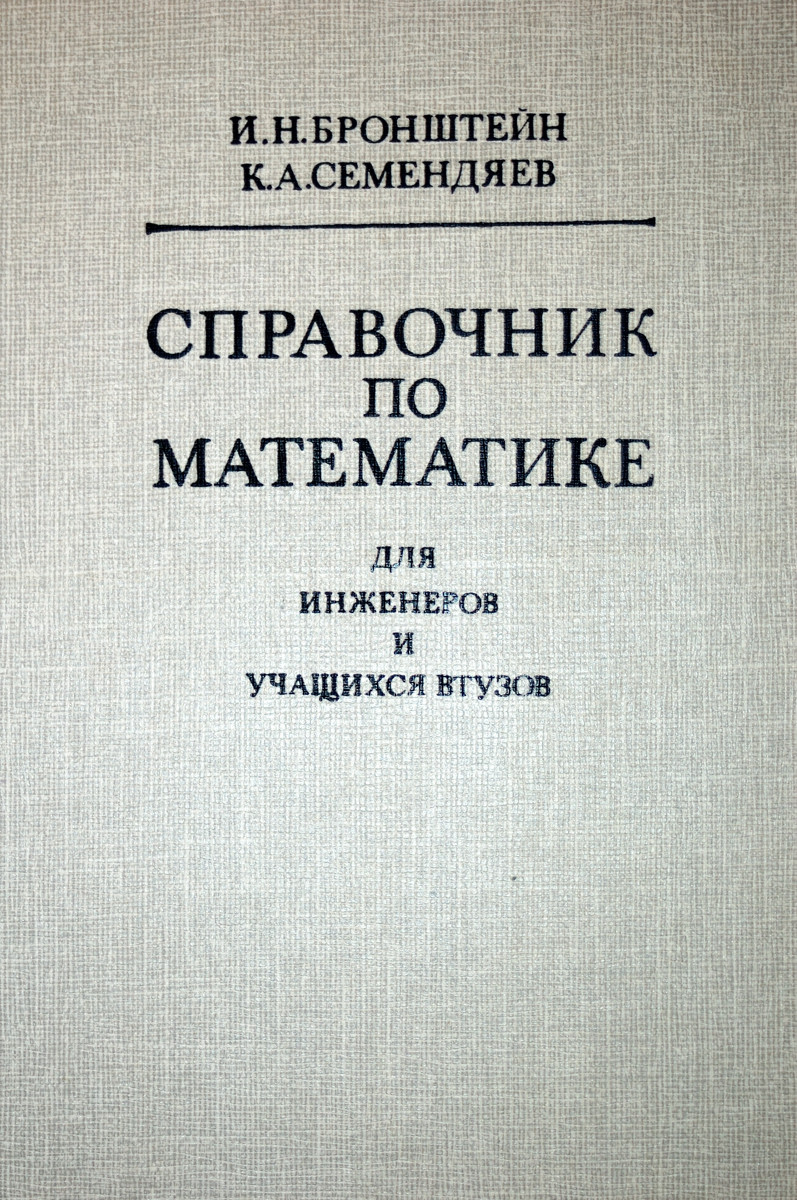
- Bronshtein and Semendyayev, 13th Russian edition by Nauka (Наука), 1986
- Author: Ilya Nikolaevich Bronshtein, Konstantin Adolfovic Semendyayev, et al.
- Language: Russian, German, Polish, Hungarian, French, Slovenian, Croatian, Serbian, English, Japanese, Spanish, Chinese
- Genre: Math
- Publication date: 1945
- Publication place: Russia, Germany

Bronshtein and Semendyayev (often just Bronshtein or Bronstein, sometimes BS) (Or Handbook Of Mathematics) is the informal name of a comprehensive handbook of fundamental working knowledge of mathematics and table of formulas originally compiled by the Russian mathematician Ilya Nikolaevich Bronshtein and engineer Konstantin Semendyayev.

The work was first published in 1945 in Russia and soon became a "standard" and frequently used guide for scientists, engineers, and technical university students. Over the decades, high popularity and a string of translations, extensions, re-translations and major revisions by various editors led to a complex international publishing history centered around the significantly expanded German version. Legal hurdles following the fall of the Iron Curtain caused the development to split into several independent branches maintained by different publishers and editors to the effect that there are now two considerably different publications associated with the original title – and both of them are available in several languages.

With some slight variations, the English version of the book was originally named A Guide-Book to Mathematics, but changed its name to Handbook of Mathematics. This name is still maintained up to the present by one of the branches. The other line is meanwhile named Users' Guide to Mathematics to help avoid confusion.

== Overview ==
Bronshtein and Semendyayev is a comprehensive handbook of fundamental working knowledge of mathematics and table of formulas based on the Russian book Справочник по математике для инженеров и учащихся втузов (Spravochnik po matematike dlya inzhenerov i uchashchikhsya vtuzov, literally: "Handbook of mathematics for engineers and students of technical universities") compiled by the Russian mathematician Ilya Nikolaevich Bronshtein (Илья Николаевич Бронштейн) (Note: Ilya Nikolaevich Bronshtein (Илья Николаевич Бронштейн) (1903–1976, GND 104989742, 1089147996) worked on the state's technical university MAMI in Moscow, History of chair of mathematics at MAMI, in Russian) and engineer Konstantin Adolfovic Semendyayev (Константин Адольфович Семендяев). (Note: Konstantin Adolfovic Semendyayev (Константин Адольфович Семендяев) (*1908-12-09, Simferopol to †1988-11-15, GND 104989750) worked in the department of applied mathematics of the Steklov Institute in Moscow. He carried out pioneering work in the area of numerical weather forecasting in Russia. Russian biography:)

The scope is the concise discussion of all major fields of applied mathematics by definitions, tables and examples with a focus on practicability and with limited formal rigour. The work also contains a comprehensive list of analytically solvable integrals, that is, those integrals which can be described in closed form with antiderivatives.

== History ==
With Dmitrii Abramovich Raikov, Bronshtein authored a Russian handbook on elementary mathematics, mechanics and physics (Справочник по елементарнои математике, механике и физике), which was published in 1943.

Around the same time in 1939/1940, Bronshtein, together with Semendyayev, also wrote their Russian handbook of mathematics for engineers and students of technical universities. Among other sources this work was influenced by the 1936 Russian translation of the 1931 edition of the much older German Hütte - Des Ingenieurs Taschenbuch. Hot lead typesetting had already started when the Siege of Leningrad prohibited further development and the print matrices were relocated. After the war, they were considered lost, but could be found again years later, so that the first edition of Справочник по математике для инженеров и учащихся втузов could finally be published in 1945.

The expanded German translation Taschenbuch der Mathematik (literally: "Pocketbook of mathematics") by Viktor Ziegler (Note: Viktor Ziegler (1922-02-10, Kurschani to 1980-10-06, Leipzig, Germany). German mathematician and lecturer.) was first published in 1958 by B. G. Teubner in Leipzig. It was honoured as "Schönstes Buch" ("Most beautiful book") of the year 1958.

Based on the German translation, an English translation became available as well under the title A Guide-Book to Mathematics in 1964, first by Pergamon Press and The Macmillan Company, later by Springer Verlag and Verlag Harri Deutsch.

In 1966, it became apparent that the title needed considerable updates to meet new requirements. The original authors felt too old to continue the work and the Russian publisher Nauka (Наука) seemed to have had lost interest in the further development as well for some while. Therefore, in 1970, a consortium of East-German mathematicians were contracted by Teubner Verlag to start to expand and revise the work. This was coordinated by Viktor Ziegler, Dorothea Ziegler (Note: Dorothea Ziegler née Hüttner (1924-06-26, Leipzig to 2013-01-18, Frauwalde), Germany. German lecturer.) and Günter Grosche (Note: Günter Grosche (–1997?), GND 1014419204, MGP-ID 151792, MR author ID 264328, Leipzig, Germany.) (University of Leipzig). While Semendyayev contributed some work, he did not want some other new chapters to be included in the manuscript in 1976, therefore they had to be split out into a new volume II. Finally, after almost a decade of work, the major new revision could be published in 1979, legally as a cooperation of Teubner and Nauka.

The reworked two-volume German edition was well received and again became a "standard" in higher mathematics education in Germany. This led to a string of high-volume revisions and translations into Russian, English and Japanese to meet the international demand. The English version was published by Van Nostrand Reinhold Company and Verlag Harri Deutsch as Handbook of Mathematics.

A decade later, the German 'Wende' and the later reunification led to considerable changes in the publishing environment in Germany between 1989 and 1991. The East-German publisher Teubner Leipzig was integrated into the West-German publisher Teubner Stuttgart. These changes put an end to the cooperation of the East-German Teubner Verlag with the West-German Verlag Harri Deutsch, who had been licensing this and other titles for distribution in Germany and Switzerland, (Note: According to DNB-IDN 572534310, 572534353 the distribution license for Verlag Harri Deutsch was for the Federal Republic of Germany (FRG) including Berlin (West), as well as for Switzerland, but not for Austria and other German-speaking regions. According to Hans-Joachim Girlich and Anna-Maria Seemann, Edition Leipzig was responsible for distribution to Austria.) a business model no longer working in a free market. Licensing issues caused the development to split into two independent branches by the two publishing houses:

Consequently, Verlag Harri Deutsch contracted Gerhard Musiol (Note: Gerhard Musiol (*1930-11-26, Deutzen, Germany) Dresden, Germany. GND 106735462, 160023831. German physicist.) and Heiner Mühlig (Note: Heiner Mühlig (1933–) Burgstädt, Germany. Dresden, Germany. GND 106922890, 1025708008. German numerical mathematician.) to start afresh and translate the last non-Teubner influenced version (officially the latest revision (1977) of the third Russian edition (1953), which is actually the eleventh Russian edition (1967)) into German for a major rework of Taschenbuch der Mathematik as a single-volume title. This was first published in 1992/1993. When Verlag Harri Deutsch closed its business two decades later, Europa-Lehrmittel took over in 2013. They continue to maintain this work up to the present (2020). The new English translation (now by Springer Verlag) is still called Handbook of Mathematics.

In a parallel development, Eberhard Zeidler, (Note: Eberhard Zeidler (*1940-10-06 to †2016-11-18) Leipzig, Germany. GND 121295869, 1090654693.) who had contributed to the Grosche and Ziegler editions already, became editor for the continuation of the latest existing German edition by Teubner (1990), the version which had previously also been distributed by Verlag Harri Deutsch, and updated it significantly to become the Teubner-Taschenbuch der Mathematik (literally: "Teubner pocketbook of mathematics") for Teubner. This was first published in 1995/1996 – still as a two-volume work. The work was continued by Vieweg+Teubner Verlag after the merger with Vieweg Verlag in 2003. When Vieweg+Teubner was bought by Springer and renamed Springer Vieweg Verlag, several new chapters were added and some more advanced contents stripped out for the single-volume Springer-Taschenbuch der Mathematik (literally: "Springer pocketbook of mathematics") in 2012/2013. This is now accompanied by a completely reworked and considerably expanded four-volume series named Springer-Handbuch der Mathematik (literally: "Springer handbook of mathematics") by Zeidler also based on the former Bronshtein and Semendyayev. So far, this latest revision of the alternative development branch isn't available in English, but volume I of the former Teubner-Taschenbuch der Mathematik has been translated and published by Oxford University Press as Oxford Users' Guide to Mathematics already.

== Editions ==
=== 1945–1978: Bronshtein and Semendyayev editions ===
==== Russian editions (1945–1977, 1998–2009) ====
Authors: Bronshtein, Ilya Nikolaevich (Бронштейн, Илья Николаевич); Semendyayev, Konstantin Adolfovic (Семендяев, Константин Адольфович).

- Nauka (Наука) Moscow Sprawotschnik po matematike dlja inschenerow i utschaschtschichsja wtusow Справочник по математике для инженеров и учащихся втузов:
  - 1st edition, 1945 (556 pages, print run of 50,000):
  - 2nd edition, 1948 (556 pages, print run of 83,000 units):
  - 3rd revised edition, 1953 (chapter IV by Shura-Bura, Mikhail Romanovich (Шура-Бура, Михаил Романович) rewritten and chapters 8–10 added):
  - 4th edition, 1954: (Gostekhizdat)
  - 5th edition, 1955
  - 6th edition, 1956 (ii+608 pages):
  - 7th edition, 1957 (609 pages)
  - 8th edition, 1959
  - 9th edition, 1962, Gosudarstvennoe Izdatel'stvo Fiziko-Matematicheskoy Literatury (Государственное издательство физико-математической литературы) (Fizmatgiz / Физматгиз).
  - 10th edition, 1964 (614 pages): ISBN 5-458-31226-0, 978-5-458-31226-4 (reprint 2013, paperback, Book on Demand Ltd.)
  - 11th edition, 1967 (608 pages + 1 inlet, last Russian edition of this series, as Nauka published in a print run of 100,000 units a translation of Mathematical Handbook for Scientists and Engineers by Granino and Theresa M. Korn instead in 1968)
  - 1977 (end of production?)
- Nauka (Наука) / Fizmatlit (Физматлит) Справочник по математике для инженеров и учащихся втузов
  - 15th edition, 1998 (Note: The 13th Russian edition was published in 1986 (based on the 12th Russian edition as of 1980, which in turn was a retranslation from the 19th German edition by Grosche and Ziegler in 1979). The 15th Russian edition (which was a reprint of the 11th genuinely Russian edition (and non-Teubner influenced), originally published in 1967) was published in 1998. So far, a 14th Russian edition based on either of these two development branches could not be identified and is likely to not have existed.) (608 pages, reprint of 11th edition 1967): ISBN 5-02-015115-7, 978-5-02-015115-4
- Lan (Лань) Sprawotschnik po matematike dlja inschenerow i utschaschtschichsja wtusow Справочник по математике для инженеров и учащихся втузов:
  - reprint edition (print run: 2000), 2009 (608 pages): ISBN 978-5-8114-0906-8, 5-8114-0906-0 (paperback)
  - reprint edition, 2010-04-21 (608 pages): ISBN 978-5-8114-0906-8

==== German editions (1958–1978) ====
Authors: Bronshtein, Ilya Nikolaevich; Semendyayev, Konstantin Adolfovic; Miller, Maximilian. (Note: Maximilian Miller (1903-11-05, Lenggries, Germany to 1980-01-16, Dresden, Germany), GND 118733966).)
Translator: Ziegler, Viktor.

- BSB B. G. Teubner Verlagsgesellschaft Taschenbuch der Mathematik:
  - 1st expanded edition, 1958 (xii+548 pages + 1 inlet sheet, based on 4th or 6th Russian edition, ca. 1954, with a chapter by Miller added)
  - 2nd edition, 1959 (xii+548 pages + 1 inlet sheet):
  - 3rd further expanded edition, 1960 (xiii+584 pages + 1 inlet sheet, with another chapter by Miller added):
  - 1st edition, 1961 (xiii+584 pages + 1 inlet sheet):
  - 2nd edition, 1961 (xiii+584 pages + 1 inlet sheet):
  - 2nd edition, 1962 (xiii+584 pages + 1 inlet sheet):
  - 3rd edition, 1962 (xiii+584 pages):
  - 4th edition, 1964 (xiii+584 pages):
  - ? edition, 1965 (xiii+584 pages + 1 inlet sheet):
  - 5th edition, 1965 (xiii+584 pages + 1 inlet sheet):
  - 6th unchanged edition, 1st printing, 1963 (xiii+584 pages): (soft plastic cover)
  - 6th edition, 2nd printing, 1965 (xiii+584 pages): (soft plastic cover)
  - 6th edition, 1966 (xiii+585 pages + 1 inlet sheet): (soft plastic cover)
  - 6th edition, 1966 (xiii+584 pages + 1 inlet sheet):
  - 7th reviewed and corrected edition, 1967 (xiii+585 pages + 1 inlet sheet):
  - 8th edition, 1967 (xiii+585 pages + 1 inlet sheet): (soft plastic cover)
  - 8th unchanged edition, 1967 (xiii+585 pages): (soft plastic cover)
  - 8th edition, 1968 [1967] (xiii+585 pages + 1 inlet sheet):
  - 9th edition, 1969 (xiii+585 pages + 1 inlet sheet):
  - 10th edition, 1969 (xiii+585 pages + 1 inlet sheet): (soft plastic cover)
  - 10th edition, 1969 (xiii+585 pages + 1 inlet sheet): (soft plastic cover)
  - 10th edition, 1970 (xiii+585 pages + 1 inlet sheet):
  - 11th edition, 1971 (xiii+585 pages + 2 inlet sheets):
  - 12th edition, 1973 (xiii+585 pages + 1 inlet sheet)
  - 12th edition, 1973 (xiii+585 pages + 2 inlet sheets):
  - 13th edition, 1973 (xiii+585 pages + 2 inlet sheets): ISBN 3-87144-016-7, 978-3-87144-016-8
  - 14th edition, 1974
  - 15th edition, 1975 (xiii+585 pages + 2 inlet sheets)
  - 15th edition, 1975 (xiii+585 pages + 2 inlet sheets): ISBN 3-87144-016-7, 978-3-87144-016-8
  - 16th edition, 1976 (xiii+585 pages + 2 inlet sheets)
  - 16th edition, 1976 (xiii+585 pages + 2 inlet sheets): ISBN 3-87144-016-7, 978-3-87144-016-8
  - 17th edition, 1977 (xiii+585 pages + 2 inlet sheets):
  - 17th edition, 1977 (xiii+585 pages + 2 inlet sheets): ISBN 3-87144-016-7, 978-3-87144-016-8
  - 18th edition, 1978 (xiii+585 pages)

==== Polish editions (1959–2019) ====
- Poradnik encyklopedyczny matematyka
  - 1959 (696 pages)
- Państwowe Wydawnictwo Naukowe (PWN), Warsaw: Matematyka Poradnik encyklopedyczny
  - 1968
  - 1973
  - 1986
  - 1996
  - 1997
  - 2004
- Wydawnictwo Naukowe PWN, Warsaw: Matematyka poradnik encyklopedyczny
  - 2010
  - 2017 (856 pages): ISBN 978-8-30116163-7
  - 2019 (856 pages)

==== Hungarian editions (1963–1987) ====
Translator: György, Bizám

- Műszaki Könyvkiadó, Budapest: Matematikai zsebkönyv
  - extended 2nd edition, 1963 (768 pages)
  - 3rd edition, 1974 (768 pages): ISBN 9-63100431-7
  - 4th edition, 1980 (768 pages): ISBN 978-9-63103310-6, 9-63103310-4, OCLC 780658058
  - 5th edition, 1982 (768 pages): ISBN 9-63104698-2
  - 6th edition, 1987 (1190 pages): ISBN 9-63105309-1

==== French editions (1963–1990) ====
Translator: Lefort, Henri

- Edition Eyrolles, Paris: aide-mémoire de mathématiques : à l'usage des ingénieurs et des élèves des grandes écoles (Note: Besides the translation of the work of I. N. Bronstejn and K. A. Szemengyajev, there are several other French books titled Aide-mémoire de mathématiques as well.)
  - 1st edition, based on 8th Russian edition (935 pages + inlet "parties proportionnelles"), 1963
  - 2nd edition, 1967
  - 1976
  - 9th edition, 1990 (935 pages)

==== Slovenian editions (1963–1994) ====
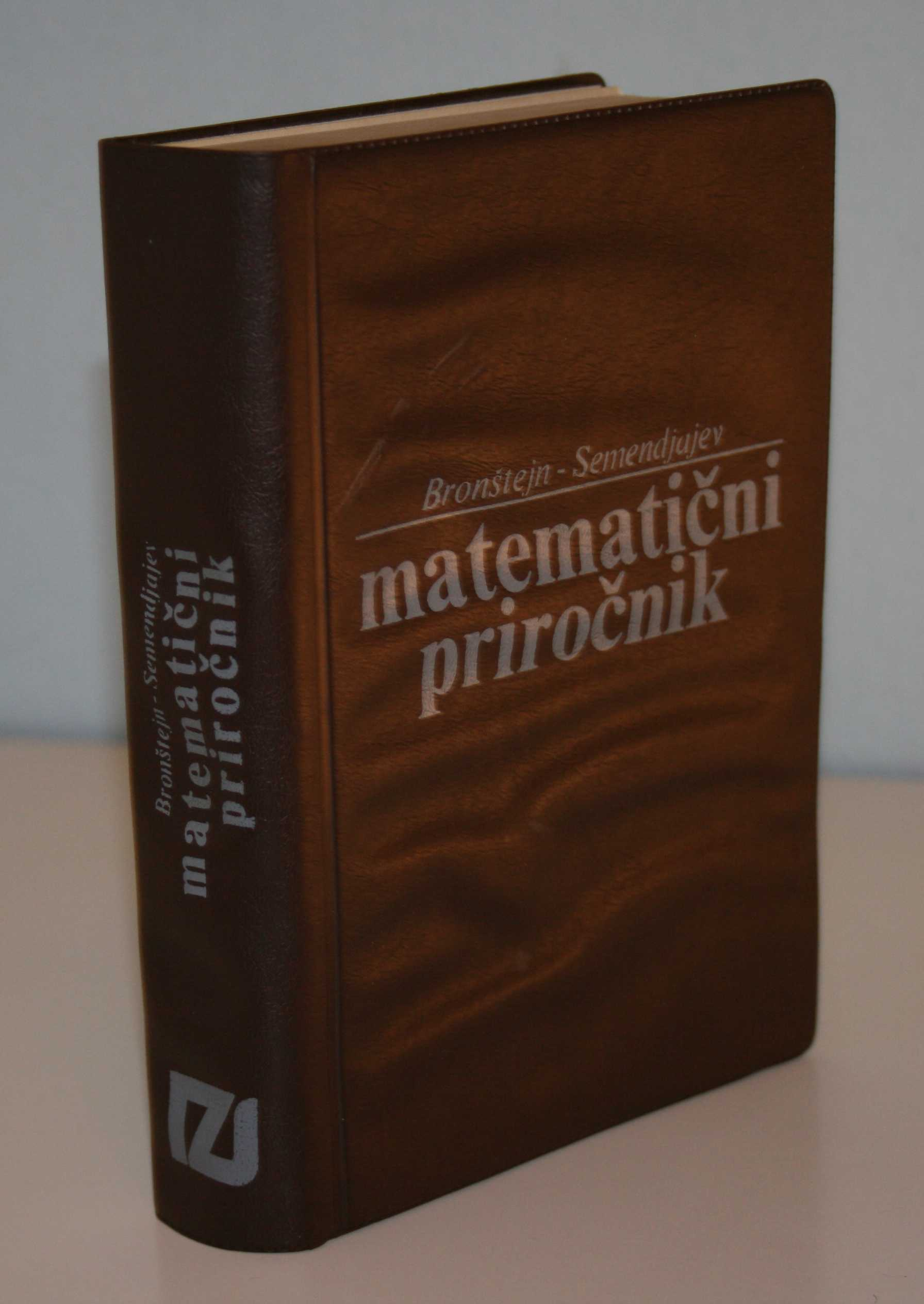
Book Matematični priročnik, 4th reprint, 1975

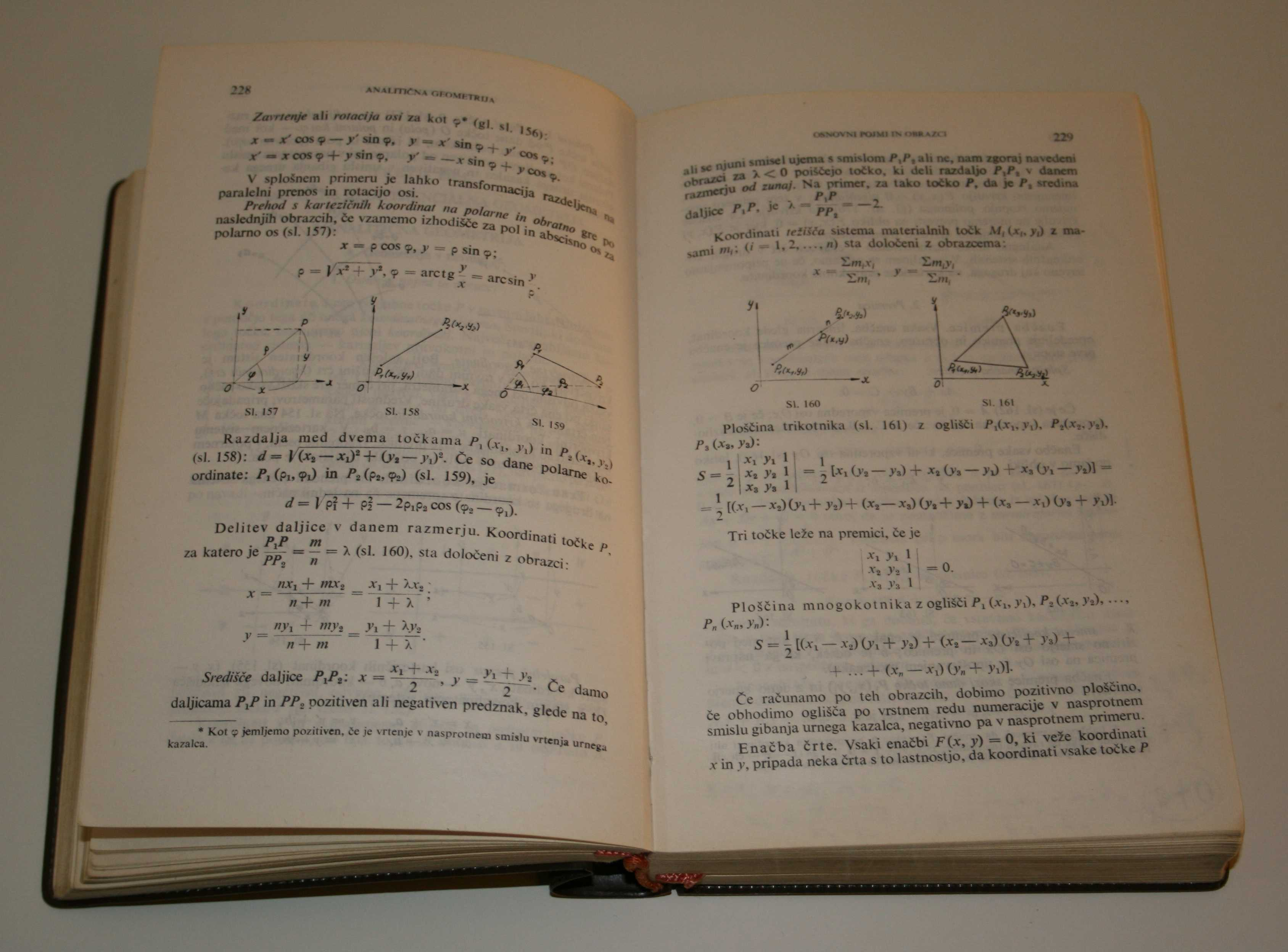
Page in Matematični priročnik, 4th reprint, 1975

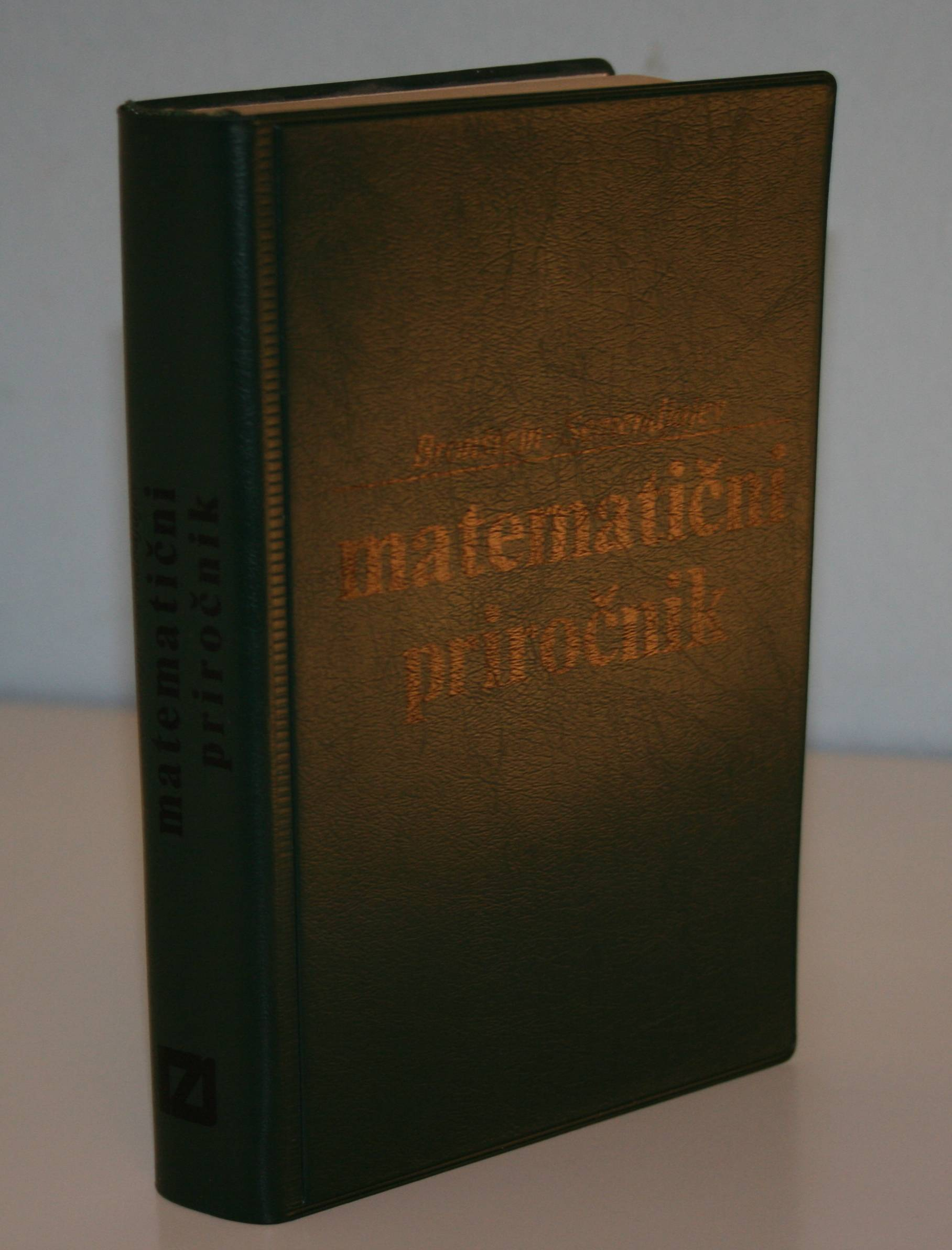
Book Matematični priročnik, 5th reprint, 1978

Translator: Žabkar, Albin

- Življenje in tehnika, Ljubljana / Ljudska pravica Matematični priročnik za inženirje in slušatelje tehniških visokih šol:
  - 1st edition, 1st printing, 1963 (2+699 pages+corrigenda): COBISS 191797
  - 1st reprint, 1967 (699 pages+corrigenda): COBISS 5344513
  - 2nd reprint, 1970 (700 pages+corrigenda): COBISS 6375425
  - 3rd reprint, 1972 (700 pages+corrigenda): COBISS 7092993
- Tehniška založba Slovenije, Ljubljana matematični priročnik:
  - 4th reprint, 1975 (pre+699 pages+corrigenda): COBISS 9186817
  - 5th reprint, 1978 (2+699 pages): COBISS 205107
  - 6th reprint, 1980 (2+699 pages): COBISS 11944193
  - 7th reprint
  - 8th reprint, 1984 (pre+699 pages): COBISS 5769984
  - 9th reprint, 1987 (pre+699 pages): COBISS 17025025
  - 10th reprint, 1988 (pre+699 pages): ISBN 86-365-0034-6, 978-86-365-0034-7, COBISS 4040192 (book)
- Tehniška založba Slovenije, Ljubljana / Ljudska pravica Matematični priročnik:
  - 11th reprint, 1990 (2+699 pages): ISBN 86-365-0064-8, 978-86-365-0064-4, COBISS 18466560 (book)
  - 12th reprint, 1992 (2+699 pages):ISBN 86-365-0086-9, 978-86-365-0086-6, COBISS 31096576 (book)
  - 13th reprint, 1994 (2+699 pages): ISBN 86-365-0157-1, 978-86-365-0157-3, COBISS 43371264 (book)

==== Yugoslav (Bosnian-Croatian-Serbian language) editions (1964–1975) ====
Editor: Blanuša, Danilo.
Translators: Vistrička, Zvonko; Uremović, Ivan

- Tehnička knjiga, Zagreb Matematički priručnik za inženjere i studente:
  - 1st edition, 1964 (695 pages, based on 9th Russian edition, 1962)
  - 1975 (696 pages)

==== English editions (1964–1973, 2013) ====
Translators: Jaworowski, Jan W.; Bleicher, Michael N.

- Pergamon Press, Oxford / The Macmillan Company, New York A Guide-Book to Mathematics for Technologists and Engineers:
  - 1st edition, 1964 (783 pages, based on German edition): ISBN 0-08-010019-8, 978-0-08-010019-7 (book)
  - 1971 (783 pages + 2 page inlet)
- Verlag Harri Deutsch / Springer Verlag New York, Inc. A Guide Book to Mathematics:
  - 1st edition, 1971 (783 pages + 1 inlet sheet, based on enlarged German edition): ISBN 3-87144-095-7, 978-3-87144-095-3 (book)
- Verlag Harri Deutsch / Springer Verlag New York, Inc. A Guide Book to Mathematics: Formulas, Tables, Graphs, Methods:
  - 1973 (783 pages + 2 page inlet sheet "Proportional parts", based on enlarged German edition): ISBN 3-87144-095-7, 978-3-87144-095-3 (book, Harri Deutsch, 1973); ISBN 0-387-91106-5, 978-0-387-91106-9 (book, Springer, 1973); doi:10.1007/978-1-4684-6288-3, ISBN 1-4684-6290-3, 978-1-4684-6290-6 (book, reprint 2013); ISBN 1-4684-6288-1, 978-1-4684-6288-3 (ebook 2013)

==== Spanish editions (1971–1988, 2001–2004) ====
Editor: Aparicio Bernardo, Emiliano.
Translator: Harding Rojas, Inés.

- Cultura popular, Mexico Manual de matemáticas para ingenieros y estudiantes
  - 1st edition, 1971 (696 pages)
- Editorial MIR, Moscow Manual de Matemáticas para ingenieros y estudiantes (based on Russian edition, 1973):
  - 2nd edition (694 pages)
  - 1988 (695 pages): ISBN 5-03-000626-5, 978-5-03-000626-0
  - 2004 (4th reprint by Rubiños-1860) of 1988 edition (696 pages): ISBN 5-03-000626-5, 978-5-03-000626-0 (paperback)
- Rubiños-1860, S.A., Madrid / Editorial MIR, Moscow Manual de Matemáticas Para Ingenieros y Estudiantes:
  - 1993 (696 pages): ISBN 84-8041-022-1, 978-84-8041-022-9
- Quinto Sol Manual de Matemáticas para ingenieros y estudiantes:
  - 2001: ISBN 968-6996-19-2, 978-968-6996-19-7 (reprint)

=== 1979–1991: Grosche and Ziegler editions ===
==== German editions (1979–1991) ====
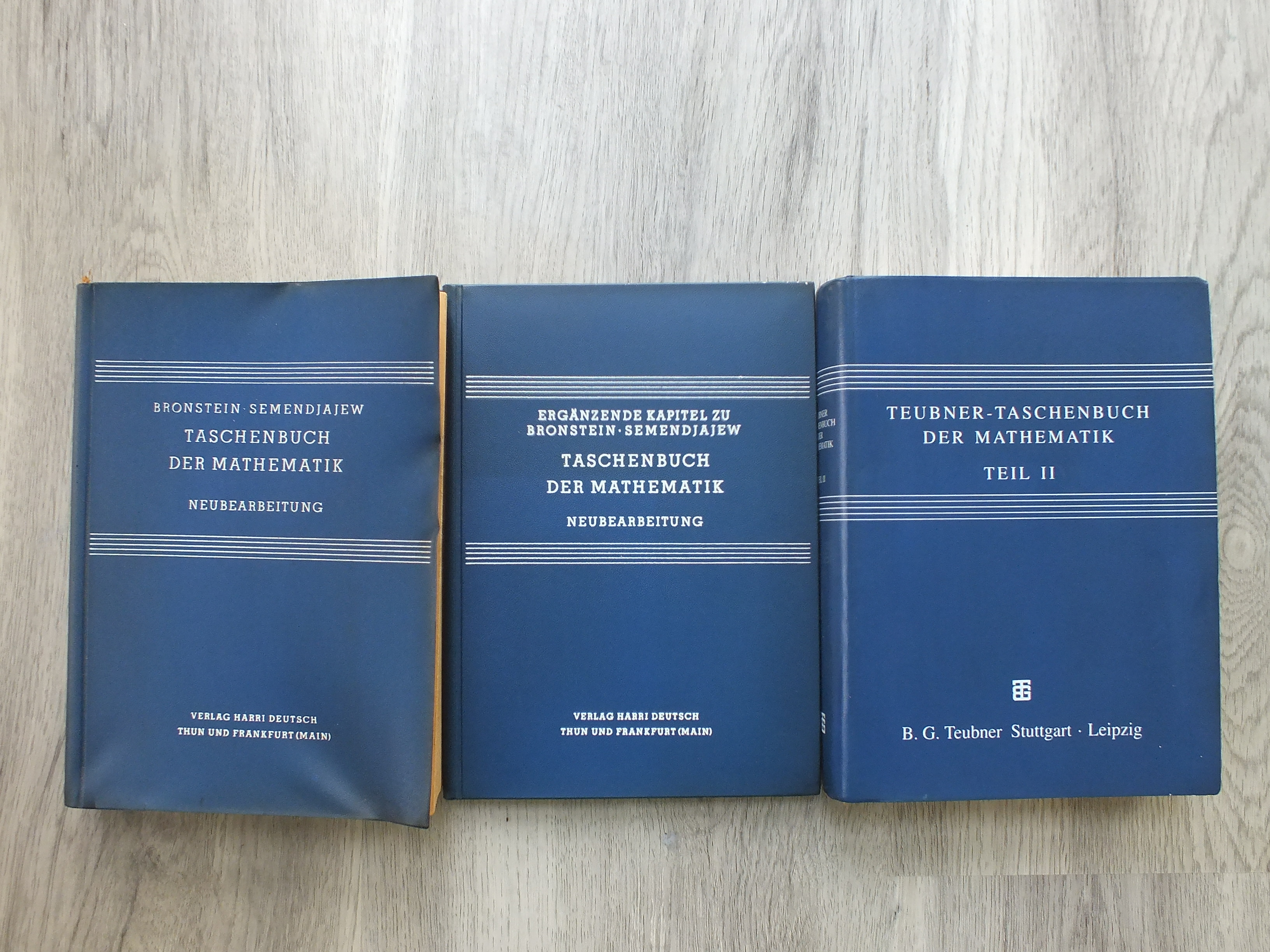
Books Volume I 19th edition (1979), Volume II 3rd edition (1984), Volume II 7th edition (1995)

Editors: Grosche, Günter; Ziegler, Viktor; Ziegler, Dorothea.
Authors: Beckmann, Peter; Belger, Martin; Benker, Hans; Denkmann, Norbert; Deweß, Monika; Erfurth, Horst; Gentemann, Helmut; Göthner, Peter; Gottwald, Siegfried; Grosche, Günter; Hilbig, Harald; Hofmann, Reinhard; Kästner, Herbert; Purkert, Walter; vom Scheidt, Jürgen; Semendjajew, Konstantin Adolfowitsch; Vettermann, Theodor; Wünsch, Volkmar; Zeidler, Eberhard.

- BSB B. G. Teubner Verlagsgesellschaft / Verlag Harri Deutsch Taschenbuch der Mathematik (yearly print run of 10,000 for Teubner and Harri Deutsch each):
  - 19th completely revised edition, 1979 [December 1978] (xi+860 pages, based on 18th German edition, 1978): ISBN 3-87144-492-8, 978-3-87144-492-0 (soft plastic cover)
  - 20th edition, 1981 (ix+840 pages): ISBN 3-87144-492-8, 978-3-87144-492-0 (soft plastic cover)
  - 21st edition, 1983 [April 1982] (ix+840 pages): ISBN 3-87144-492-8, 978-3-87144-492-0 (soft plastic cover)
  - 22nd edition, 1985 (ix+840 pages): ISBN 3-87144-492-8, 978-3-87144-492-0 (soft plastic cover)
  - 23rd edition, 1987 (xii+840 pages): ISBN 3-87144-492-8 / ISBN 978-3-87144-492-0 (soft plastic cover)
  - 24th edition, 1989 (xii+840 pages): ISBN 3-87144-492-8, 978-3-87144-492-0 (soft plastic cover)
  - 25th edition, 1991 (xii+824 pages): ISBN 3-8154-2000-8, 978-3-8154-2000-3 (soft plastic cover)

Editors: Grosche, Günter; Ziegler, Viktor; Ziegler, Dorothea.
Authors: Bär, Gunter; Deweß, Günter; Deweß, Monika; Gerber, Siegmar; Göhde, Dietrich; Jentsch, Lothar; Miller, Maximilian; Piehler, Joachim; Zeidler, Eberhard.

- BSB B. G. Teubner Verlagsgesellschaft / Verlag Harri Deutsch Ergänzende Kapitel zu Taschenbuch der Mathematik – Neubearbeitung:
  - 1st edition, 1980 [1979] (v+218 pages): ISBN 3-87144-493-6, 978-3-87144-493-7
  - 2nd edition, 1981 (v+218 pages): ISBN 3-87144-493-6, 978-3-87144-493-7
  - 3rd edition, 1984 (v+218 pages): ISBN 3-87144-493-6, 978-3-87144-493-7
  - 4th edition, 1986 (vi+218 pages): ISBN 3-87144-493-6 / ISBN 978-3-87144-493-7
  - 5th edition, 1988 (v+234 pages): ISBN 3-8171-1051-0, 978-3-8171-1051-3
  - 6th edition, 1990 (vi+234 pages): ISBN 3-8171-1051-0, 978-3-8171-1051-3

==== Russian editions (1980–1986) ====
Editors: Grosche, Günter; Ziegler, Viktor; Ziegler, Dorothea.

- Nauka (Наука) / Tec-Theor-Lit Spravočnik po matematike: dlja inženerov i učaščichsja vtuzov:
  - 12th completely revised edition, 1980 (retranslation from 19th German edition)
  - 12th edition, 1981 (718 pages, retranslation from 19th German edition, 1979)
- Nauka (Наука), Moscow / GFML (ГФМЛ) Sprawotschnik po matematike dlja inschenerow i utschaschtschichsja wtusow Справочник по математике для инженеров и учащихся втузов:
  - 13th corrected edition, 1986 (544 pages, two-color print, 250,000 units): ISBN 1-70200-000-1, 978-1-70200-000-0 (book)
  - 13th edition, 1986 (544 pages)

==== English editions (1985, 1998) ====
Editor: Beckmann, Peter.
Translator: Hirsch, Kurt August

- Verlag Harri Deutsch / Van Nostrand Reinhold Company Handbook of Mathematics:
  - 3rd completely revised edition, 1985 (xv+973 pages, based on 19th/20th German edition, licensed from Edition Leipzig): ISBN 3-87144-644-0, 978-3-87144-644-3 (soft plastic cover)
  - 3rd completely revised edition, 1985 (xv+973 pages, based on 19th/20th German edition, licensed from Edition Leipzig): ISBN 0-442-21171-6, 978-0-442-21171-4 (soft plastic cover)
- Springer Handbook of Mathematics:
  - reprint of 3rd edition, 1997/1998 (978 pages): ISBN 978-3-540-62130-0, 3-540-62130-X (book)
  - reprint of 3rd edition, 1998 (xxx+973 pages): ISBN 978-3-662-21982-9, doi:10.1007/978-3-662-21982-9 (ebook)

==== Japanese editions (1985–1987) ====
Translators: Miyamoto, Toshio (宮本 敏雄); Matsuda, Nobuyuki (松田 信行).

- Morikita Publications (森北出版), Tokyo 数学ハンドブック (literally: "Handbook of mathematics"):
  - November 1985 (1226 pages, based on German edition): ISBN 4-627-05080-1, 978-4-627-05080-8 (paperback)
- Morikita Publications (森北出版), Tokyo 基礎数学ハンドブック (Kiso sugaku handobukku, literally: "Basic handbook of mathematics"):
  - 1986 (721 pages): ISBN 4-627-05070-4, 978-4-627-05070-9 (hardcover)
  - 1987 (685 pages): ISBN ? (hardcover)

=== 1995–2013: Zeidler editions ===
==== German editions (1995–2013) ====
Editor (part I): Zeidler, Eberhard.
Authors (part I): Hackbusch, Wolfgang; Schwarz, Hans Rudolf; Zeidler, Eberhard.

Editors (part II): Grosche, Günter; Ziegler, Viktor; Ziegler, Dorothea; Zeidler, Eberhard.
Authors (part II): Claus, Volker; Deweß, Günter; Deweß, Monika; Diekert, Volker; Fuchssteiner, Benno; Gottwald, Siegfried; Gündel, Susanne; Hoschek, Josef; Olderog, Ernst-Rüdiger; Richter, Michael M.; Schenke, Michael; Widmayer, Peter; Zeidler, Eberhard.

- Teubner, Stuttgart Teubner-Taschenbuch der Mathematik:
  - part I, 1st edition, 1996 [1995] (xxvi+1298 pages, based on 25th German edition, 1990): ISBN 3-8154-2001-6, 978-3-8154-2001-0 (soft plastic cover)
  - part II, 7th completely reworked and extended edition, 1st printing, 1995 (xvi+830 pages, based on 6th German edition, 1990): ISBN 3-8154-2100-4, 978-3-8154-2100-0 (soft plastic cover); ISBN 3-322-95375-0, 978-3-322-95375-9 (ebook)
  - part II, 7th edition, 2nd printing, 1996 [1995] (xvi+830 pages): ISBN 3-8154-2100-4, 978-3-8154-2100-0 (soft plastic cover)
- Vieweg+Teubner Verlag Teubner-Taschenbuch der Mathematik:
  - part I, 2nd reviewed edition, 2003 (xxv+1298 pages): ISBN 3-519-20012-0, 978-3-519-20012-3 (book); ISBN 3-322-96781-6, 978-3-322-96781-7 (ebook)
  - part II, 8th reviewed edition, 1st printing, 2003 (xvi+830 pages): ISBN 3-519-21008-8, 978-3-519-21008-5 (book); ISBN 3-322-90191-2, 978-3-322-90191-0 (ebook)
  - part II, 8th reviewed edition, 2nd printing, 2012 [2003] (xvi+830 pages): ISBN 3-519-21008-8, 978-3-519-21008-5 (book); ISBN 3-322-90192-0, 978-3-322-90192-7 (softcover / paperback)

Editors: Zeidler, Eberhard.
Authors: Hackbusch, Wolfgang; Hromkovič, Juraj; Luderer, Bernd; Schwarz, Hans Rudolf; Blath, Jochen; Schied, Alexander; Dempe, Stephan; Wanka, Gert; Gottwald, Siegfried; Zeidler, Eberhard.

- Springer Spektrum, Vieweg+Teubner Verlag (Springer Fachmedien Wiesbaden) / Springer Vieweg Springer-Taschenbuch der Mathematik:
  - 3rd reworked and extended edition, 2013 [2012] (xx+1310 pages): (Note: Springer-Handbuch der Mathematik I includes chapters 0–1 of Springer-Taschenbuch der Mathematik plus additional material.) (Note: Springer-Handbuch der Mathematik II includes chapters 2–4 of Springer-Taschenbuch der Mathematik plus additional material.) (Note: Springer-Handbuch der Mathematik III includes chapters 5–9 of Springer-Taschenbuch der Mathematik plus additional material.) (Note: Springer-Handbuch der Mathematik IV chapters 10–19 include additional material not covered by Springer-Taschenbuch der Mathematik at all.) ISBN 978-3-8351-0123-4, 3-8351-0123-4 (softcover); ISBN 978-3-8348-2359-5, 3-8348-2359-7 (ebook with additional content)

Editors: Zeidler, Eberhard.
Authors: Hackbusch, Wolfgang; Hromkovič, Juraj; Luderer, Bernd; Schwarz, Hans Rudolf; Blath, Jochen; Schied, Alexander; Dempe, Stephan; Wanka, Gert; Gottwald, Siegfried; Zeidler, Eberhard.

- Springer Spektrum, Springer Fachmedien Wiesbaden Springer-Handbuch der Mathematik:
  - part I, 1st edition, 2013 [Summer 2012] (xii+635 pages): ISBN 978-3-658-00284-8, 3-658-00284-0 (hardcover); ISBN 978-3-658-00285-5, 3-658-00285-9 (ebook)
  - part II, 1st edition, 2013 [Summer 2012] (xi+329 pages): ISBN 978-3-658-00296-1, 3-658-00296-4 (hardcover); ISBN 978-3-658-00297-8, 3-658-00297-2 (ebook)
  - part III, 1st edition, 2013 [Summer 2012] (xiii+529 pages): ISBN 978-3-658-00274-9, 3-658-00274-3 (hardcover); ISBN 978-3-658-00275-6, 3-658-00275-1 (ebook)
  - part IV, 1st edition, 2013 [Summer 2012] (xvii+622 pages): ISBN 978-3-658-00288-6, 3-658-00288-3 (hardcover); ISBN 978-3-658-00289-3, 3-658-00289-1 (ebook)

==== English editions (2004–2013) ====
Editor: Zeidler, Eberhard.
Authors: Hackbusch, Wolfgang; Schwarz, Hans Rudolf; Zeidler, Eberhard.
Translator: Hunt, Bruce.

- Oxford University Press Oxford Users' Guide to Mathematics:
  - 2004 (xxii+1284 pages, based on German Teubner-Taschenbuch der Mathematik, part I, 2003): ISBN 0-19-850763-1, 978-0-19-850763-5 (soft plastic cover)
  - 2013: ISBN 0-19-968692-0, 978-0-19-968692-6 (book)

==== Chinese edition (2012) ====
Editor: Zeidler, Eberhard (埃伯哈德·蔡德勒)
Translator: Li Wenlin (李文林)

- 科学出版社 (Science Press), Beijing: Teubner-Taschenbuch der Mathematik - 数学指南：实用数学手册 [Math guide - handbook of practical mathematics] (based on the 2nd German edition of Teubner-Taschenbuch der Mathematik and the English edition of Oxford Users' Guide to Mathematics)
  - 1st edition, 2012 (1303? pages): ISBN 978-7-03032540-2, 7-03032540-0, OCLC 861985784

=== 1992–2020: Musiol and Mühlig editions ===
==== German editions (1992–2020) ====
Editors: Musiol, Gerhard; Mühlig, Heiner.
Authors: Baumann, Ulrike; Brunner, Jürgen; Flach, Günter; Fleischer, Norbert Mozesovich (Флайшер, Норберт Мозесович); Grauel, Adolf; Reif, Roland; Reitmann, Volker (Райтманн, Фолькер); Steinert, I.; Marsolek, Lothar; Musiol, Gerhard; Mühlig, Heiner; Nickel, Heinz; Weber, Matthias; Ziesche, Paul.

- Verlag Harri Deutsch Taschenbuch der Mathematik:
  - 1st edition, 1993 [1992] (xxvi+848 pages, based on the Russian 1967 or 1977 revision): ISBN 3-8171-2001-X, 978-3-8171-2001-7 (book) (white/blue soft plastic cover)
  - 2nd edition, 1995: ISBN 3-8171-2002-8, 978-3-8171-2002-4 (book) (white/blue soft plastic cover)
  - 3rd edition, 1997/1998: ISBN 3-8171-2003-6, 978-3-8171-2003-1 (book) (white/blue soft plastic cover)
  - 4th edition, 1999 (1151 pages): ISBN 3-8171-2004-4, 978-3-8171-2004-8 (book); ISBN 3-8171-2014-1, 978-3-8171-2014-7 (book with CD-ROM) (soft plastic cover)
  - 5th edition, 2000 (1234 pages): ISBN 3-8171-2005-2, 978-3-8171-2005-5 (book); ISBN 3-8171-2015-X, 978-3-8171-2015-4 (book with CD-ROM) (white/red/black soft plastic cover)
  - 6th edition, 2005 (ca. 1242 pages): ISBN 3-8171-2006-0, 978-3-8171-2006-2 (book); ISBN 3-8171-2016-8, 978-3-8171-2016-1 (book with CD-ROM) (white/red/black soft plastic cover)

Editors: Musiol, Gerhard; Mühlig, Heiner.
Authors: Baumann, Ulrike; Bernstein, Swanhild; Brand, Joachim; Brunner, Jürgen; Buchleitner, Andreas (CD-ROM only); Flach, Günter; Fleischer, Norbert Mozesovich (Флайшер, Норберт Мозесович); Grauel, Adolf; Reif, Roland; Reitmann, Volker (Райтманн, Фолькер); Rumpf, Benno (CD-ROM only); Steinert, I.; Tiersch, Markus (CD-ROM only); Marsolek, Lothar; Mulansky, Bernd; Musiol, Gerhard; Mühlig, Heiner; Nickel, Heinz; Weber, Matthias; Wellens, Thomas (CD-ROM only); Ziesche, Paul.

- Verlag Harri Deutsch Taschenbuch der Mathematik:
  - 7th edition, 2008 (1268 pages): ISBN 3-8171-2007-9, 978-3-8171-2007-9 (book); ISBN 3-8171-2017-6, 978-3-8171-2017-8 (book with CD-ROM) (white/red/black soft plastic cover)
  - 8th edition, 2012 (1235 pages): ISBN 978-3-8171-2008-6, 3-8171-2008-7 (book); ISBN 3-8171-2018-4, 978-3-8171-2018-5 (book with CD-ROM) (white/red/black soft plastic cover)
- Europa-Lehrmittel (Edition Harri Deutsch) Taschenbuch der Mathematik:
  - 9th corrected edition, 2013 (1280? pages, based on 8th German edition by Verlag Harri Deutsch, 2012, incorporating corrections after 5th English edition by Springer): ISBN 978-3-8085-5671-9, 3-8085-5671-4 (book); ISBN 978-3-8085-5673-3, 3-8085-5673-0 (book with CD-ROM) (white/red/black soft plastic cover)
  - 10th edition, 2016 (xli+1233 pages): ISBN 978-3-8085-5789-1, 3-8085-5789-3 (book); ISBN 978-3-8085-5790-7, 3-8085-5790-7 (book with CD-ROM) (white/red/black soft plastic cover)
  - 11th edition, 2020-07-28 (ca. 1280 pages): ISBN 978-3-8085-5792-1, 3-8085-5792-3 (soft plastic cover); ISBN 978-3-8085-5794-5, 3-8085-5794-X (HTML download)

==== Slovenian editions (1997–2020) ====
Contributors: Barbič, Janez; Dolinar, Gregor; Jurčič-Zlobec, Borut; Mramor Kosta, Neža.
Translator: Barbič, Janez.

- Tehniška Založba Slovenije, Ljubljana Matematični priročnik:
  - 2nd reworked edition, 1997 (xxvii+967 pages, based on German edition): ISBN 86-365-0216-0, 978-86-365-0216-7, COBISS 11427633
  - 1st reprint of 2nd reworked edition, 1997 (xxvii+967 pages): COBISS 63781120, DNB-IDN 959535268 (soft plastic cover)
  - 1st corrected reprint of 2nd reworked edition, 2009 (xxvii+967 pages): ISBN 961-251-189-6, 978-961-251-189-0, COBISS 248688896
  - 2nd corrected reprint of 2nd reworked edition, 2012 (xxvii+967 pages): ISBN 978-961-251-189-0, COBISS 261048832
  - 3rd corrected edition (xxvii+967 pages): ISBN 978-9-61251189-0, 9-61251189-6 OCLC 1267930319

==== Hungarian editions (2000–2009) ====
- Typotex, Budapest: Matematikai kézikönyv (based on German edition by Verlag Harri Deutsch, 1999) (Note: Besides the translation of the work of I. N. Bronstejn, K. A. Szemengyajev, G. Musiol and H. Mühlig, there are several other Hungarian books titled Matematikai kézikönyv as well, including an unrelated work by Merta Ildikó and a translation of Granino and Theresa Korn's work named Matematikai kézikönyv műszakiaknak, which served as kind of a predecessor on the Hungarian market.)
  - 1st edition, 2000 (1188 pages): ISBN 963-9132-59-4
  - 8th edition, 2002 (1210 pages): ISBN 963-9326-53-4
  - 8th corrected and revised edition, 2006 (1209 pages): ISBN 963-9326-53-4
  - 9th edition, 2009 (1209 pages): ISBN 978-963-2790-79-4

==== English editions (2002–2015) ====
Editors: Musiol, Gerhard;Mühlig, Heiner.
Authors: Baumann, Ulrike; Brunner, Jürgen; Flach, Günter; Fleischer, Norbert Mozesovich (Флайшер, Норберт Мозесович); Grauel, Adolf; Reif, Roland; Reitmann, Volker (Райтманн, Фолькер); Steinert, I.; Marsolek, Lothar; Musiol, Gerhard; Mühlig, Heiner; Nickel, Heinz; Weber, Matthias; Ziesche, Paul.
Translator: Szép, Gabriella.

- Springer Verlag, Heidelberg Handbook of Mathematics:
  - 4th edition, 2002 (1000? pages, based on 5th German edition, 2000): ISBN 978-3-540-43491-7, 3-540-43491-7 (book)
  - 4th edition, 2004 (lxxxiv+1158 pages, based on 5th German edition, 2000): ISBN 978-3-662-05382-9, doi:10.1007/978-3-662-05382-9 (ebook)
  - 5th edition, 2007 (lxxxvi+1164 pages, based on 6th German edition, 2005): ISBN 978-3-540-72121-5, 3-540-72121-5 (book); ISBN 978-3-540-72122-2, 3-540-72122-3, LCCN 2007-930331, doi:10.1007/978-3-540-72122-2 (ebook)

Editors: Musiol, Gerhard; Mühlig, Heiner.
Authors: Baumann, Ulrike; Bernstein, Swanhild; Brand, Joachim; Brunner, Jürgen; Buchleitner, Andreas (CD-ROM only); Flach, Günter; Fleischer, Norbert Mozesovich (Флайшер, Норберт Мозесович); Grauel, Adolf; Reif, Roland; Reitmann, Volker (Райтманн, Фолькер); Rumpf, Benno (CD-ROM only); Steinert, I.; Tiersch, Markus (CD-ROM only); Tóth, János; Marsolek, Lothar; Mulansky, Bernd; Musiol, Gerhard; Mühlig, Heiner; Nickel, Heinz; Weber, Matthias; Wellens, Thomas (CD-ROM only); Ziesche, Paul.

- Springer Verlag, Heidelberg Handbook of Mathematics:
  - 6th edition, 2015 (xliv+1207 pages, based on 9th German edition, 2013): ISBN 978-3-662-46220-1, 3-662-46220-6, LCCN 2015-933616, doi:10.1007/978-3-662-46221-8 (book); ISBN 978-3-662-46221-8, 3-662-46221-4 (ebook)

==== Croatian edition (2004) ====
Translator: Uremović, Ivan

- Golden marketing, Tehnička knjiga Matematički priručnik:
  - 4th edition, 2004 (xliv+1168 pages, based on the 5th German edition, 2000): ISBN 953-212-176-5, 978-953-212-176-6

==== Serbian edition (2004) ====
Translators: Šućur, Miljenko; Valčić Trkulja, Milena.

- Soho Graph, Belgrade Matematički priručnik:
  - 1st edition, 2004 (xxxviii+1191 pages, based on the 5th German edition, 2000): ISBN 86-83987-12-4, 978-86-83987-12-2

==== Polish editions (2007–2020) ====
- Wydawnictwo Naukowe PWN, Warsaw: Nowoczesne kompendium matematyki
  - 2007 (1258 or 1260 pages)
  - 2013 (1259 pages): ISBN 978-83-01-14148-6
  - 2015
  - 2020

==== Chinese edition (2020) ====
Editors: Bronstein (布龙施泰因), Semendyayev (谢缅佳耶夫), Musiol (穆西奥尔), Mühlig (米利希)
Translators: Li Wenlin (李文林) et al.

- 科学出版社 (Science Press), Beijing: Taschenbuch der Mathematik - 数学手册 (原书第10版) [Mathematics Handbook] (based on the 10th German edition of Taschenbuch der Mathematik)
  - 1st edition, 2020-12 (1547? pages): ISBN 978-7-03-063706-2

== Bronshtein-integrability ==
Due to Bronshtein and Semendyayev containing a comprehensive table of analytically solvable integrals, integrals are sometimes referred to as being "Bronshtein-integrable" in German universities if they can be looked up in the book (in playful analogy to terms like Riemann-integrability and Lebesgue-integrability).

== See also ==
- Hütte
- Korn (KK)
- Abramowitz and Stegun (AS)
- Gradshteyn and Ryzhik (GR)
- CRC Standard Mathematical Tables
