= Edition Leipzig =

German publishing house

Edition Leipzig was a publisher in the German Democratic Republic (GDR/DDR), which, for the most part, placed books on Western markets as an export publisher. This was intended to serve representative purposes as well as to procure foreign currency. Today, the publishing house is part of the Seemann Henschel publishing group, which was taken over by Zweitausendeins in October 2017 with a program on regional and cultural history.

From 1960 to 1984 more than 1000 book titles were published, of which more than 500 were published in foreign languages and about 60 even in multilingual versions.

In the first phase, which lasted up to 1965, the publication of scientific and technical books predominated. Later, cultural and art historical as well as popular scientific works were added to a greater extent. The Edition Leipzig became known for high-quality facsimiles and historical reprints. Fictional titles were rare, and marketing for this genre was discontinued as it was seen as not being profitable enough due to the publisher's lack of market presence in the relevant target countries.

== Founding era ==
The idea to create a book publishing house directly connected to a related Außenhandelsunternehmen (Foreign trade institution) was first formulated in 1956. The publishing house Edition Leipzig was then founded in Leipzig in 1960.

The name Edition Leipzig allowed to publish books in Western countries and in particular the old Federal Republic of Germany (FRG/BRD) also from GDR publishers which were the result of expropriations from traditional publishers and for which namesake publishers existed in West Germany as a continuation of the traditional publishers such as Brockhaus, Reclam or Meyer. The West German publishers in question actively boycotted the appearance of their namesake GDR publishers, so that the latter could not market their publishing program especially on the West German market. These GDR publishers were typically also not allowed to take part at the Frankfurt Book Fair.

The elaborations that led to the founding of the publishing house Edition Leipzig began at the headquarters of E. A. Seemann in Leipzig. Edition Leipzig was initially granted hospitality rights in the Akademische Verlagsgesellschaft Geest & Portig (AVG). It was not until 20 June 1960 that Edition Leipzig moved into its own permanent premises at Karlstrasse 20.

At first, books were taken over from other GDR specialist publishers. Standard works which could be easily placed on the market were the first choice. Until 1965, scientific and technical titles prevailed in the GDR. The first book, which was published by Edition Leipzig, was the "Taschenbuch der Mathematik" (Handbook of mathematics) by Ilya Nikolaevich Bronshtein and Konstantin Adolfovic Semendyayev by B. G. Teubner Verlag. (Note: According to Hans-Joachim Girlich, Edition Leipzig was responsible for distribution of B. G. Teubner Verlag's title "Taschenbuch der Mathematik" (Handbook of mathematics) aka Bronshtein and Semendyayev to Austria. According to DNB-IDN 572534310 and 572534353, the distribution license for this title for the Federal Republic of Germany (FRG) including Berlin, as well as for Switzerland (but not for Austria and other German-speaking regions), was obtained by Verlag Harri Deutsch.) Between 1958/1961 and 1969/1970, 10 editions were published through Edition Leipzig and Verlag Harri Deutsch to Western countries, whereas Teubner focused on the local market.

One of the first titles developed by Edition Leipzig itself was the book "Schlag nach: Fakten über die Deutsche Demokratische Republik" (Look it up: Facts about the German Democratic Republic), which in 1961 was launched in 17 languages simultaneously. This was followed by art prints about monuments, picture galleries and state museums of the GDR. A "Technische Grundlagen" (Technical basics) series, published in several languages, was specially designed for Third World countries.

Co-production with foreign publishers was sought early on in order to improve the sales opportunities at the respective foreign markets.

== Reissue of rare old books ==
Since the production was not bound by the normal conditions of capitalism and also was intended to represent the GDR in the Western world, some high-quality books came onto the market that are still valuable today. In particular through facsimile processing of old library stocks using the collotype process, broader readerships were enabled to access rare books otherwise impossible to read. Works that were particularly elaborate in terms of printing and binding were published in limited editions. A highlight of these editions was the "Stundenbuch" (Book of hours) of Louis I of Orléans, which, in 1980, appeared in a print run of only 800 copies at a price of 2850 marks.

Earlier re-editions were from the third/fourth century "Proverbial codex", an "ancient Egyptian otherworld guide to Amun-em-uja" from the papyrus collection of the Berlin State Museums, the Hebrew manuscript "Machsor Lipsiae" from the Leipzig University Library, the "Astronomicum Caesareum" by Peter Apian and "Afrika aus Karten des 12. bis 18. Jahrhunderts" (Africa from maps of the 12th to 18th centuries). The "Atlas des Großen Kurfürsten" from the Berlin State Library published in a magnificent edition in 1971 was the most expensive undertaking until that date at 4140 marks. However, at 85 × 125 cm, the facsimile was only half the size of the original. Other works were a selection from "The Birds of America", the "Leningrader Aquarelle", the "Leningrader Studienbuch – Schmetterlinge, Käfer, Insekten" (Leningrad study book - butterflies, bugs, insects), "America in Maps", the "Bilderbuch für Kinder" (Picture books for children) or the poor's bible "Biblia pauperum".

After 1980, works such as the "Lothringische Apokalypse" (Lorraine apocalypse), a bible print or the "Fest-Epistolar Friedrichs des Weisen", which, even at a price of 5950 marks, could not cover the production costs. Other examples from the 1980s are the works "Berliner Architektur-Zeichnungen 1870–1890" (Berlin architectural drawings 1870–1890) (1987) and "Asien auf Karten vom 12. Jahrhundert bis zur Mitte des 19. Jahrhunderts" (Asia on maps from the 12th century to the mid-19th century) (1989).

The series "Bibliothek alter kulinarischer Werke" (Library of old culinary works) was less ambitious, however, it is still a valuable source for fans of old cookbooks.

The series "Historische Kinderbücher" (Historical children's books) was particularly popular with it historical reprints. These were, however, not facsimiles, but reset books aimed to be similar to the original. Details such as mold stains or small damages caused by the users of the original were thus not reproduced. Other titles were the oldest version of the "Erste Novgoroder Chronik" (First Novgorod chronicle) (1016–1352) with the first German translation, or the "Sonneberger Spielzeugmusterbuch" from 1831. Also, the series "Historische Kartenspiele" (Historical card games) which first appeared in 1967 can be counted to this type of productions.

== Era of exclusive in-house production in the GDR ==
Around 1970–1971, the publishing house had established itself on the market. It produced only its own productions, with thematically related series being grouped together. This is how the series "Das Bild der Frau" (The image of women) came about with works such as "Die Frau im alten Ägypten" (The ancient Egyptian woman), "Die Frau im Islam" (The Muslim woman) or "Die Frau im Sozialismus" (The socialist woman).

Works such as "Geschichte der Naturwissenschaften" (History of natural sciences) were published in a series called "Wissenschaftliche Sammlung" (Scientific collection).

The animal book series included works such as "Das große Katzenbuch" (The big cat book). The series "Weltstädte der Kunst" (World cities of art) was published in several languages from 1965 to 1981. The series "Kunstdenkmäler in den sozialistischen Ländern" (Art monuments in socialist countries) contains many titles.

Thereby, a sales problem arose due to the high selling prices and other reasons. Since the books were not aimed at the domestic market, it was not possible to produce large enough print runs to be more profitable. Due to the high competitive pressure, the method of producing works of the highest quality, which had been successfully used in other areas, didn't prove to be very successful in this area. Some series were therefore quickly discontinued.

Works such as "Der Künstler und seine Werkstatt" (The artist and his workshop) or "Tierbilder" (Animal pictures) fell under the series heading "Kunstbücher für Kinder" (Art books for children). Despite the initial enthusiasm, this proved to be a less successful concept overall, as it did not sell very well in the foreign markets.

With the facsimile of the "Meißners Musterbuchs für Höroldt-Chinoiserien" (Meißner pattern book for Höroldt Chinoiseries) a series on the subject of porcelain art was introduced. It contained works that had, for example, Meissen porcelain in Art Nouveau as their theme. Books such as "Historische Zielscheiben" (Historical targets) or "Seefahrer-Souvenirs" (Seafarers' souvenirs) were published in a series named "Kulturgeschichtliche Miniaturen" (Cultural-historical miniatures). Popular scientific non-fiction books such as "Fabelwesen und Dämonen, eine Kulturgeschichte der Mischwesen" (Mythical creatures and demons, a cultural history of hybrid creatures) or "Becher, Humpen und Pokale, eine Kulturgeschichte des Trinkens und der Trinkgefäße" (Beakers, tankards and cups, a cultural history of drinking and drinking vessels) were published in this second period under the heading of cultural history. In addition, works such as the "Schlachten der Weltgeschichte" (Battles of world history) or "Die Hanse und das Grand Empire" (The Hanseatic League and the British Empire) are to be grouped into this genre as well. The actually formulated "didactic purpose" of books with such a selection of topics from different scientific areas was to help improve insight on connections and relations and thus to train the power of judgment.

Archival material from the publisher is now in the Sächsisches Staatsarchiv – Staatsarchiv Leipzig.

== After the German reunification ==
In 1992, Silvius Dornier combined the art publishers E. A. Seemann, Edition Leipzig and Henschel Musik/Henschel Verlag with other publishers in a publishing group, separating the programs: Seemann took over the fine arts, whereas Edition Leipzig took the regional and cultural history, and Henschelverlag the performing arts.

Since April 2003, Dornier sold these three art publishers to new shareholders, operating now with the fourth publisher, Koehler & Amelang, under the name of the publishing group Seemann Henschel GmbH & Co. KG.

In terms of content, the Edition Leipzig is still very much in line with the focus of the original edition established in the GDR. For example, themes such as Meissen porcelain, glass painting or Saxony's palaces, castles and gardens are dealt with in an entire book series. In addition, selected older successful titles are made available again.

== See also ==
- Henschel Musik
- Henschelverlag
- E. A. Seemann Verlag
