= Europa-Lehrmittel =

German publishing house since 1948

Coordinates: 51.21855°N 7.005825°E

Verlag Europa-Lehrmittel Nourney, Vollmer
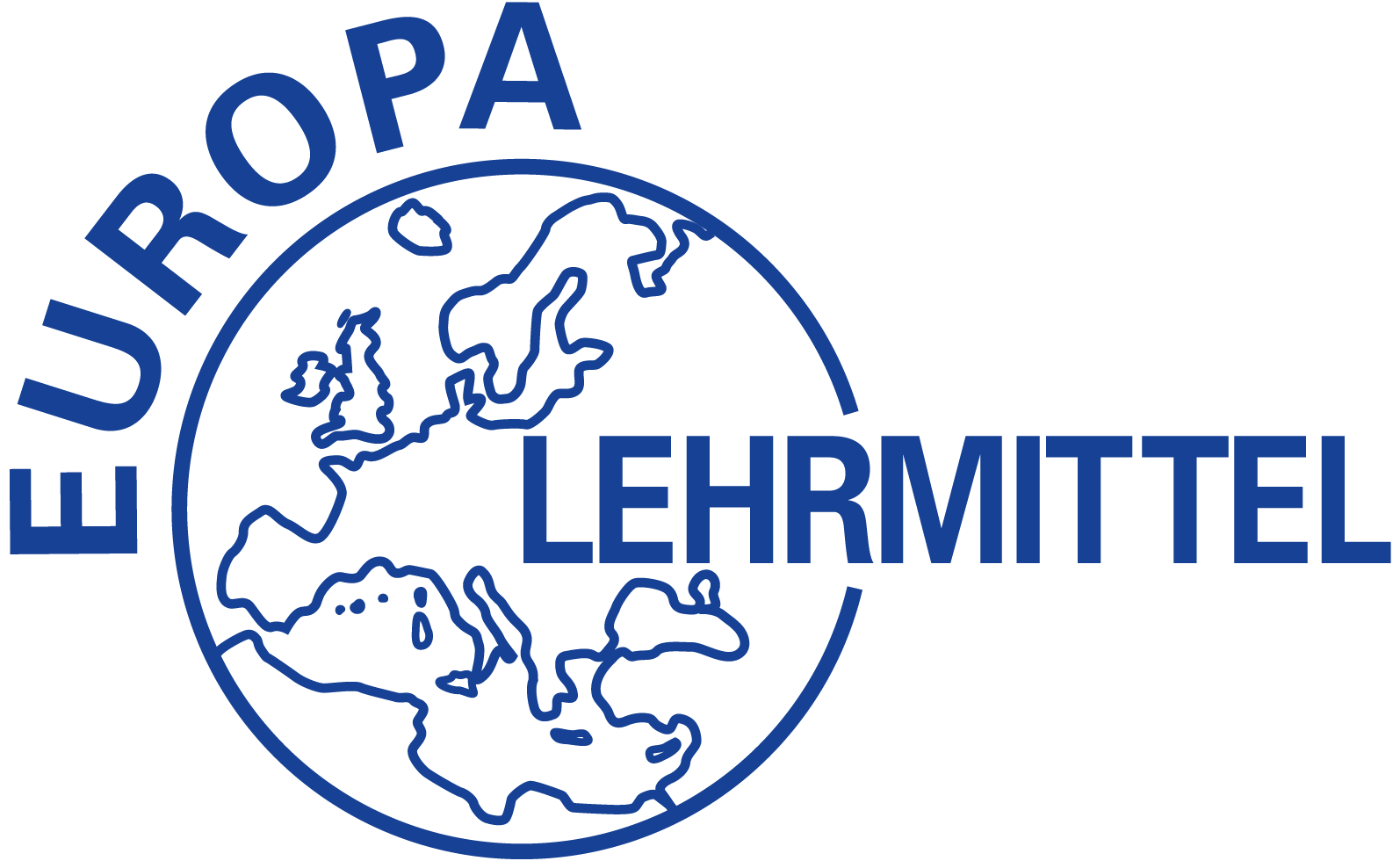
- Type: GmbH & Co. KG
- Industry: Publisher / Educational Media
- Founded: 1948
- Headquarters: Haan, Germany
- Key people: Jacob Kloepfer, Tim Nourney (Managing Director)
- Website: www.europa-lehrmittel.de

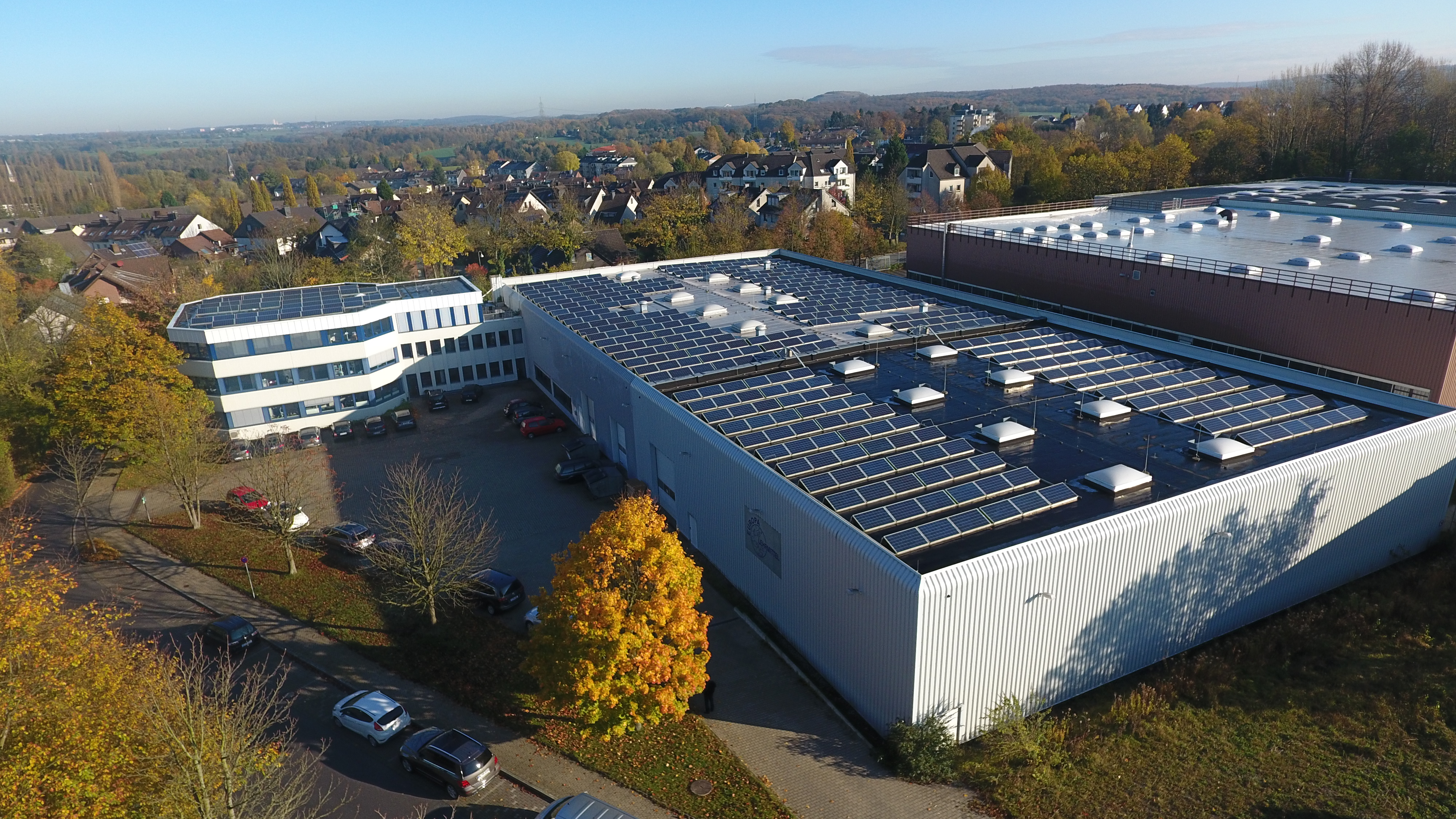
Publishing house in Haan-Gruiten (2017)

The Verlag Europa-Lehrmittel Nourney, Vollmer GmbH & Co. KG (English: European educational media), based in Haan (district Gruiten) near Düsseldorf, Germany, develops educational media for vocational training and further education as used in vocational schools, universities, companies and further education institutions for industrial-technical, business, social, health as well as gastronomic professions. The contents are delivered in print as well as in digital formats, including offered as apps, simulations, software and through an exam preparation portal. The publisher has its own digital learning platform, the Europathek.

General partner is Nourney, Vollmer & Co. GmbH, a school and specialist book publisher.

== History ==
The publishing house was founded in Wuppertal in 1948, when the first books were published. In Eislingen/Fils a construction office was set up to create the technical drawings for the textbooks - today the drawing office of the publisher in Ostfildern. A little over 40 years later, in 1989, a new company building was built in Haan-Gruiten.

In 1997, Europa-Lehrmittel acquired the Fachbuchverlag Pfanneberg with its program aimed at gastronomic professions. Further program expansions in vocational training were realized by adding titles of the publishing houses Lau, Gerber, Pluspunkt, parts of the Verlag Handwerk und Technik program and that of the Gildebuchverlag.

In 2013, the scientific and technical university titles of Verlag Harri Deutsch were taken over, including the bestselling "Handbook of Mathematics" by Ilya Nikolaevich Bronstein and Konstantin Adolfovic Semendyayev. In addition, Europa-Lehrmittel's first exam apps appeared.

In 2017, the publisher introduced its own digital learning platform named Europathek. The Prüfungsdoc (English: Examination Doc) platform, which enables targeted online preparation for exams, went online the same year.

In 2018, the titles of the Düsseldorf publishing house SOL for self-organized learning were incorporated into Europa-Lehrmittel's program.

== Program ==
The program meanwhile includes well over 2000 print and digital publications, including specialist titles on metal technology, automotive and electrical engineering (like "Tabellenbuch Metall" (English: Metal Book of Tables)), on business administration, as well as works for the gastronomic profession (e.g. "Der junge Koch" (English: The Young Cook)).

Many titles also appear as licensed editions in over 20 different languages on all continents.

All contents are presented in an annual catalog, on the website, in schools, in companies, and at trade fairs and congresses.

The publisher is a member of the Deutscher Hauswirtschaftsrat.

== Digital educational media ==
Europathek: In addition to digital books, Europathek also provides media packages, additional materials and e-learning contents. The online contents of the 'media shelf' can be used per web browser. There are also software versions and apps for offline use, with the help of which the obtained titles can be viewed after downloading.

Prüfungsdoc (English: Examination Doc): Prüfungsdoc offers web-based learning, practice and repetition to prepare for the intermediate and final examinations. This includes simulations of the exams with direct evaluation of the results.
