= Verlag Harri Deutsch =

German publishing house between 1961 and 2013

- Genre: Mathematics, sciences, technology
- Founded: 1961
- Founder: Harri Deutsch
- Defunct: 2013
- Fate: dissolved
- Successor: Europa-Lehrmittel
- Headquarters: Frankfurt am Main, Zürich and Thun
- Key people: Martin Kegel
- Footnotes / references 978-3-87144

The Verlag Harri Deutsch (VHD, HD) with headquarters in Frankfurt am Main, Germany, as well as in Zürich and Thun, Switzerland, was a German publishing house founded in 1961 and closed in 2013.

== Overview ==
The Verlag Harri Deutsch with headquarters in Frankfurt am Main, Germany, was a German publishing house founded by Harri Deutsch in 1961 (Note: Founding date of German Verlag Harri Deutsch: 1961-01-17, GND 2025635-8 and 1065358334.) as a spin-off of the scientific bookstore Fachbuchhandlung Harri Deutsch (FHD), which had existed for about a decade earlier. Both were situated near Goethe-Universität Frankfurt am Main. Between 1963 (Note: Founding date of Swiss Verlag Harri Deutsch: 1963, GND 106536363X and 1064137555.) and about 1979 the publisher also had an office in Zürich. Around 1974 another branch was opened in Thun. (Note: The Frankfurt am Main-based Harri Deutsch GmbH was founded on 1992-12-18 and formally opened on 1993-05-03. It was reorganized into the Wissenschaftlicher Verlag Harri Deutsch GmbH on 2001-01-19. The Thun-based Harri Deutsch AG opened on 1993-07-06 and was liquidated since 2000-10-26. It was dissolved on 2002-08-22.)

The company's activities focussed mostly on textbooks and encyclopedic works in the areas of mathematics, physics, chemistry and other sciences and technologies, in the first three decades in particular titles licensed from publishers of the former Eastern Bloc including the East-German publishers Edition Leipzig, BSB B. G. Teubner Verlagsgesellschaft, Akademie Verlag, VEB Bibliographisches Institut, VEB Verlag Enzyklopädie, VEB Fachbuchverlag Leipzig, VEB Deutscher Verlag der Wissenschaften, VEB Akademische Verlagsgesellschaft (AVG), the Russian publishers Nauka (Наука) and MIR, and others. The publications, some of which came in colored plastic soft covers, were popular also for their often very affordable prices.

In 1997, Martin Kegel took over the active management of the company. After the death of the founder Harri Deutsch (Note: Harri Deutsch (1922–2000), GND 136886469.) in 2000, the Swiss branch Verlag Harri Deutsch AG went into liquidation on 26 October 2000 and was dissolved on 22 August 2002. The German Harri Deutsch GmbH was reorganized into the Wissenschaftlicher Verlag Harri Deutsch GmbH on 19 January 2001 under Kegel's lead. With no successor in sight it stopped its business activities on 31 May 2013 to prepare for Kegel's retirement later that year. Selected stock and publishing rights were transferred to the German publisher Europa-Lehrmittel.

In a parallel development, the bookstore was sold off to the Heymanns group, Cologne, on 1 January 2001 as Buchhandlung Harri Deutsch GmbH, which went into insolvency and was taken over by Fachbuch Mediasales GmbH & Co. KG in Gladenbach in 2004. When this became insolvent as well in 2006, the bookstore was refounded by Kegel as Wissenschaftliche Verlagsbuchhandlung Harri Deutsch GmbH on 8 March 2007 until it was finally closed on 22 August 2013.

== Selected publications ==
One of the publisher's bestsellers was Taschenbuch der Mathematik (A Guide Book to Mathematics, Handbook of Mathematics). Originally, this work by the Russians Bronstein and Semendjajew was translated and edited by Viktor and Dorothea Ziegler and Günter Grosche for the East-German publisher BSB B. G. Teubner Verlagsgesellschaft. Some contingents of the East German print runs were dedicated for Verlag Harri Deutsch who had obtained a license from Teubner for distribution of the title in Western countries. (Note: According to DNB-IDN 572534310 and 572534353 the distribution license for Verlag Harri Deutsch was for the Federal Republic of Germany (FRG) including Berlin (West), as well as for Switzerland, but not for Austria and other German-speaking regions. According to Hans-Joachim Girlich and Anna-Maria Seemann, Edition Leipzig was responsible for distribution to Austria.) Following licensing problems resulting from market environmental and legal changes caused by the German reunification, the title was reworked by Gerhard Musiol and Heiner Mühlig now based on the latest non-Teubner influenced Russian edition and independently produced by Verlag Harri Deutsch.

The Taschenbuch der Physik (literally: Pocketbook of physics) by Horst Kuchling was another bestseller licensed from VEB Fachbuchverlag Leipzig.

Another highly regarded title, licensed from the East-German VEB Deutscher Verlag der Wissenschaften, was their German translation Lehrgang der höheren Mathematik of Vladimir Ivanovich Smirnov's seven-volume work Курс высшей математики (A Course in Higher Mathematics).

Licensed from the Russian Verlag MIR (with permission from Nauka and VEB Deutscher Verlag der Wissenschaften) was the third German-English edition of Tafeln / Tables: Summen-, Produkt- und Integraltafeln / Tables of Series, Products, and Integrals by Iosif Moiseevich Ryzhik and Izrail Solomonovich Gradshteyn in 1981.

Licensed from Akademie Verlag was Lehrbuch der theoretischen Physik in ten volumes, edited by Gerhard Heber and Paul Ziesche. This was a German translation of the renowned textbook Курс теоретической физики by Lev Davidovich Landau and Evgeny Mikhailovich Lifshitz. The title was also available in English as Course of Theoretical Physics.

Harri Deutsch also licensed a series of classical scientific works known as "Ostwalds Klassiker der exakten Wissenschaften" (originally edited by Wilhelm Ostwald) from VEB Akademische Verlagsgesellschaft.

Authored by Walter Greiner, the publisher also offered the title Theoretische Physik (Theoretical physics) in 13 volumes. Some of these volumes were available in English translations, edited by David Allan Bromley and published by Springer-Verlag.

Another successful title was Taschenbuch der Riechstoffe (Pocketbook of fragrances) by Dieter Martinez and Roland Hartwig.

In 1999, Harri Deutsch introduced the electronic publishing series cliXX (for educational courses) and DeskTop (for encyclopedic publications) under the label hades (harri deutsch electronic science) under the editorial guidance of Horst Stöcker utilizing HTML structures.

== See also ==
- Pergamon Press
- Plenum Press
