= Ostwalds Klassiker der exakten Wissenschaften =

German scientific book series

Ostwalds Klassiker der exakten Wissenschaften (English: Ostwald's classics of the exact sciences) is a German book series that contains important original works from all areas of natural sciences. It was founded in 1889 by the physical chemist Wilhelm Ostwald and is now published by Europa-Lehrmittel.

== History ==
The series was first published by Wilhelm Engelmann in Leipzig and then by Akademische Verlagsgesellschaft in Leipzig and more recently in reprints and new editions by Verlag Harri Deutsch in Frankfurt.

Ostwald's aim was to remedy the "Mangel an Kenntnis jener großen Arbeiten, auf welchen das Gebäude der Wissenschaft ruht" (Lack of knowledge of those great works on which the edifice of science rests). The first volume in 1889 was Über die Erhaltung der Kraft (On the conservation of power) (first 1847) by Hermann von Helmholtz. In 1894, the physicist Arthur von Oettingen von Ostwald took over the editing (and remained editor until 1920, when Ostwald's son, Wolfgang Ostwald, took over the task). However, Ostwald initially continued to publish the chemistry volumes until he was replaced by Richard Abegg. 195 volumes were published by 1915; then there was an interruption due to the First World War until 1919. From 1919, they were published by the Akademische Verlagsgesellschaft, which also reprinted older editions. In 1923, the two hundredth volume was published (work by Wilhelm Ostwald on catalysis). From 1938 (volume 244) to 1954 (volume 245) there was a break due to World War II. The series was then continued by the successor to the Akademische Verlagsgesellschaft in the GDR, the Akademische Verlagsgesellschaft Geest & Portig. This was from 1968 with the B. G. Teubner Verlag, who was thus co-editor of the series. The successor to the Akademische Verlagsgesellschaft in der FRG, based in Frankfurt am Main, also published a Neue Folge (new series) from 1965 (the publishing house existed until 1983), of which six titles were published (from Volume 4 in 1968 they were published by Vieweg in Braunschweig). From 1982 there were reprints of the old series before the Second World War, in West Germany by the publishing house Verlag Harri Deutsch in Frankfurt, which specialized in the publication of scientific literature from the GDR in the FRG. A total of 275 volumes were published by 1987.

== Volumes by Akademische Verlagsgesellschaft after World War II ==
After World War II (Note: For the volumes before the interruption by World War II see Wikisource.) published by Akademische Verlagsgesellschaft, Verlag Harri Deutsch and Europa-Lehrmittel (except for reprints and new editions of the old series):

- 245 Carl Ramsauer: Wirkungsquerschnitt der Edelgase gegenüber langsamen Elektronen
- 246 Georg Christoph Lichtenberg: Über eine neue Methode, die Natur und die Bewegung der elektrischen Materie zu erforschen
- 247 Alexander von Humboldt: Ideen zu einer Physiognomik der Gewächse
- 248 Alexander von Humboldt: Ideen zu einer Geographie der Pflanzen
- 249 Eduard Poeppig: Tropenvegetation und Tropenmenschen
- 250 Wilhelm Ostwald: Volumchemische Studien über Affinität und volumenchemische und optisch-chemische Studien
- 251 Heinrich Hertz: Über sehr schnelle elektrische Schwingungen
- 252 Pavel Alexandrov et al.: Die Hilbertschen Probleme
- 253 Felix Klein: Das Erlanger Programm
- 254 Francis Crick, Robert Holley, James D. Watson: Abhandlungen zur Molekulargenetik
- 255 Ejnar Hertzsprung: Zur Strahlung der Sterne
- 256 Carl Friedrich Gauß: Mathematisches Tagebuch
- 257 Wilhelm Ostwald: Gedanken zur Biosphäre
- 258 Ernst Chladni: Über den kosmischen Ursprung der Meteorite und Feuerkugeln
- 259 Carl Schorlemmer: Ursprung und Entwicklung der organischen Chemie
- 260 Gerhard Harig: Physik und Renaissance
- 261 Leonhard Euler: Zur Theorie komplexer Funktionen
- 262 Max Volmer: Zur Kinetik der Phasenbildung und Elektrodenreaktion
- 263 Heinrich Hertz: Prinzipien der Mechanik
- 264 Manfred von Ardenne: Arbeiten zur Elektronik
- 265 Jacobus van 't Hoff: Studien zur chemischen Dynamik
- 266 Jaroslav Heyrovský: Polarographie
- 267 Wilhelm Ostwald: Zur Geschichte der Wissenschaft. Four manuscripts from the Nachlaß
- 268 Karl August Möbius: Zum Biozönose-Begriff. Die Auster und die Austernwirtschaft
- 269 Peter Simon Pallas: Über die Beschaffenheit der Gebirge und die Veränderungen der Erdkugel
- 270 R. Klaus Müller (ed.): Dokumente zur Entwicklung der Toxikologie im 19. Jahrhundert
- 271 Johann Wilhelm Ritter: Entdeckungen zur Elektrochemie, Bioelektrochemie und Photochemie
- 272: Friedlieb Ferdinand Runge, Raphael Eduard Liesegang, Boris Pavlovich Belousov, Anatol Markovich Zhabotinsky: Selbstorganisation chemischer Strukturen
- 273 Johannes Kepler: Vom sechseckigen Schnee
- 274 Hermann Sachse, Ernst Mohr: Zur Konformation des Cyclohexans
- 275 Matthias Jacob Schleiden, Theodor Schwann, Max Schultze: Klassische Schriften zur Zellenlehre
- 276 Ernst Abbe: Briefwechsel mit Adolf Ferdinand Weinhold
- 277–279 Jean-Baptiste de Lamarck: Zoologische Philosophie 1–3
- 280 Franz Xaver Zach: Astronomie der Goethezeit
- 281 Manfred Eigen: Die unmeßbar schnellen Reaktionen
- 282
- 283 Joseph von Gerlach: Die Anfänge der histologischen Färbung und der Mikrophotographie
- 284 Marie Curie: Die Entdeckung des Radiums
- 285 Sigmund Exner: Entwurf zu einer physiologischen Erklärung der psychischen Erscheinungen
- 286 Ludwig Boltzmann: Entropie und Wahrscheinlichkeit
- 287 Alexander Alexandrowitsch Friedmann: Die Welt als Raum und Zeit
- 288 William Herschel: Über den Bau des Himmels
- 289 Frederick Soddy: Die Natur des Radiums
- 290 Walther Nernst: Begründung der Theoretischen Chemie
- 291 Karl Friedrich Zöllner: Grundzüge einer allgemeinen Photometrie des Himmels
- 292–294 Michael Faraday: Experimentaluntersuchungen über Elektrizität, 3 volumes
- 295 Johannes Kepler: Tertius interveniens: Warnung an etliche Gegner der Astrologie, das Kind nicht mit dem Bade auszuschütten
- 296 Robert Bunsen: Gasometrische Methoden
- 297 Charles Bonnet: Systemtheorie und Philosophie organisierter Körper
- 298 Paul Drude: Zur Elektronentheorie der Metalle
- 299 Max Planck: Über thermodynamische Gleichgewichte
- 300 Nikolaus Kopernikus: Über die Umschwünge der himmlischen Kreise
- 301/302 Pierre-Simon Laplace: Darstellung des Weltsystems 1, 2
- 303 Paul Emil Flechsig, Hans Berger: Gehirn und Seele
- 304 Georges Lemaître: Von der klassischen Kosmologie zum Quantenkosmos

== Volumes by Akademische Verlagsgesellschaft, Frankfurt ==
Only six volumes were published by Akademische Verlagsgesellschaft, Frankfurt, which, as a new series, did not follow the old series in terms of numbering:

- Volume 1, Simon Stevin: De Thiende
- Volume 2, Johann Wilhelm Ritter: Die Begründung der Elektrochemie und Entdeckung der ultravioletten Strahlung
- Volume 3, Niels Stensen: Das Feste im Festen
- Volume 4, Neun Bücher über arithmetische Technik (The Nine Chapters on the Mathematical Art)
- Volume 5, Wilhelm Weber, Rudolf Kohlrausch: Über die Einführung absoluter elektrischer Maße
- Volume 6, Gregor Mendel: Versuche über Pflanzenhybriden (already published in the old series)

More volumes were planned (such as François Viète's Einführung in die Algebra (Introduction to Algebra), which was published elsewhere in 1973).
