= Raikov =

Raikov is a Russian surname.

- Dmitry Raikov, mathematician
- Yevgeny Tikhonovich Raikov, opera singer
- Boris Yevgenyevich Raikov, biologist

== See also ==
- Raikov (Metal Gear)
