= Hromkovič =

Hromkovič is a surname. Notable people with the surname include:

- Juraj Hromkovič (born 1958), Slovak computer scientist and professor
- Martin Hromkovič (born 1982), Slovak footballer
