= Eberhard Zeidler =

Eberhard Zeidler may refer to:

- Eberhard Heinrich Zeidler (1926–2022), German-Canadian architect
- Eberhard Hermann Erich Zeidler (1940–2016), German mathematician
