= Fachbuchverlag Leipzig =

East-German publishing house

Logo

The Fachbuchverlag Leipzig (fv; English: Specialist book publisher Leipzig) was an East German publisher. It continues to exist as an imprint of the Munich publishing firm Carl Hanser Verlag.

== Company history ==
The publishing house was founded in early 1949 by several shareholders (including FDGB, Kammer der Technik). The first managing director was Heinz Schöbel. From 1960 to 1990 the specialist book publisher was a Volkseigener Betrieb (VEB) (English, "publicly owned enterprise"). It was one of the two most renowned technical-scientific publishers in the German Democratic Republic, whose specialist books were also widely distributed in the Federal Republic of Germany. The books were very popular with West-German students because of their low price, but above all because of the good didactics. It also published specialist journals.

In 1995, the specialist book publisher was taken over by the Munich Carl Hanser Verlag and continued to exist there as an imprint. Under the brand, some of the editors of Carl Hanser Verlag continue to publish around 60 specialist books a year. The subject areas are general technology, mechanical engineering, electrical engineering, computer science, environmental and media technology, as well as economics, plastics and process engineering.

Among the particularly popular 32 volumes of handbooks, which appeared in millions of editions, is the Taschenbuch der Physik (literally: Pocketbook of physics) by Horst Kuchling, the so-called "Kuchling", in its 20th edition, also under license from Verlag Harri Deutsch.

== Book series ==
- Bibliothek Wissen und Schaffen
- Grosse Sowjet-Enzyklopädie
- Holztechnik
- Lehrbücher für den Facharbeiter fur Holztechnik
- Nachschlagebücher für Grundlagenfächer
- Polytechnische Bibliothek

== See also ==
- B. G. Teubner Verlag
