= Stiftung Benedictus Gotthelf Teubner =

German foundation

Teubner-Stiftung
- Stiftung Benedictus Gotthelf Teubner Leipzig / Dresden / Berlin / Stuttgart
- Formation: 2003
- Founder: Jürgen Weiß
- Type: Foundation under civil law
- Headquarters: Leipzig, Germany
- Staff: Foundation Board and Foundation Advisory Board
- Website: www.stiftung-teubner-leipzig.de

The Stiftung Benedictus Gotthelf Teubner Leipzig / Dresden / Berlin / Stuttgart, in short: Teubner-Stiftung (English: Teubner Foundation), was founded on 21 February 2003 in the Haus des Buches (English: House of the Book) at Gutenbergplatz, Leipzig.

== Purpose ==
The Teubner foundation aims to keep the memory of the work of the Saxon company founder, publisher, bookseller, book printer, typographer and Leipzig city councilor Benedictus Gotthelf Teubner alive in the public.

The purpose of the foundation is to promote science and research in the sense of B.G. Teubner.

== Awards ==
Since 2004, the foundation has been awarding the Benedictus-Gotthelf-Teubner-Förderpreis. The winners so far are:

- 2004: Albrecht Beutelspacher (Mathematics Gießen)
- 2005: Leipziger Schülergesellschaft für Mathematik (LSGM) (English: Leipzig Student Society for Mathematics)
- 2009: Mathematische Schülergesellschaft (MSG) (English: Mathematical Student Society) "Leonhard Euler" at the Humboldt University Berlin
- 2010: Erlebnisland Mathematik (English: Adventureland Mathematics) (joined project of the Department of Mathematics / TU Dresden with the Technische Sammlungen Dresden)
- 2011: Adam-Ries-Bund Annaberg-Buchholz
- 2012: Mathematical journal Die Wurzel in Jena
- 2015: Urania Berlin e.V.
- 2018: Gauss-Gesellschaft e.V. Göttingen

On the 200th anniversary of the founding date of the company by BG Teubner in Leipzig on 21 February 1811, the Benedictus Gotthelf Teubner Wissenschaftspreis (English: Benedictus Gotthelf Teubner Science Prize) was awarded to the mathematician Hans Triebel (Friedrich Schiller University Jena). The celebration was held during the annual conference of the Teubner Foundation on 21 February 2011 in the Leibniz lecture hall of the Max Planck Institute for Mathematics in the Natural Sciences in Leipzig.

Since 2014, the foundation has been awarding the Wissenschaftspreis der Teubner-Stiftung zur Förderung der Mathematischen Wissenschaften (English: Science Prize of the Teubner Foundation for the Promotion of Mathematical Sciences). Winners:

- 2014: Eberhard Zeidler (Leipzig)
- 2016: Stefan Hildebrandt (1936–2015), posthumously
- 2018: Jürgen Jost (Leipzig)
- 2020: Gerhard Huisken (Tübingen / Oberwolfach)
