= Theresa M. Korn =

American engineer, radio enthusiast, and airplane pilot (1926–2020)

- Born: Theresa Marie McLaughlin; November 5, 1926; St. Louis, Missouri, U.S.
- Died: April 5, 2020 (aged 93); Wenatchee, Washington, U.S.
- Education: Carnegie Institute of Technology University of California, Los Angeles (Master's)
- Employer(s): Curtiss-Wright, Boeing
- Known for: Author, engineer, radio enthusiast, and airplane pilot

Theresa Marie Korn (née McLaughlin, November 5, 1926 – April 9, 2020) was an American engineer, radio enthusiast, and airplane pilot. The first woman to earn an engineering degree from what is now Carnegie Mellon University, she was the author of multiple books on engineering and mathematics.

A fictionalized version of Korn is one of the characters in the novel Kay Everett Calls CQ by Amelia Lobsenz (Vanguard Press, 1951), describing a girls' summer road trip adventure in the 1940s with ham radio and flying components.

== Life ==
Theresa McLaughlin was born in St. Louis, Missouri, on November 5, 1926, the daughter of a civil engineer. When she was one year old, a storm damaged her family home, breaking her nose, and the family moved to Greensburg, Pennsylvania, where she grew up. As a high school student, she became a ham radio operator in 1941, and flew Atlantic reconnaissance patrols as an airplane pilot for the Civil Air Patrol, becoming the youngest pilot and radio operator in the country. She became a member of the Ninety-Nines society of female pilots, and graduated as the valedictorian of Greensburg High School in 1943, winning the Bausch and Lomb Science Award and a Carnegie Scholarship to the Carnegie Institute of Technology, which later became Carnegie Mellon University.

Since its founding in 1903, the Carnegie Institute had admitted women as students, but only through its Margaret Morrison Carnegie College for women, not through its engineering school, and her scholarship was to this college, through which McLaughlin could take engineering classes but would be barred from earning an engineering degree. By refusing her scholarship and instead accepting money from her pilot friends to pay for her tuition, McLaughlin was able to gain admission to the engineering school instead of to the women's college, becoming the first female student at the school. While studying, she earned a radio license and began working for WHGB, a local radio station, but quit over being paid less than the station's male employees, and took another job working on the electrical systems of arcade games. Despite opposition to teaching her from some male faculty members, she graduated with a bachelor's degree in electrical engineering in 1947, and was nominated for membership in Eta Kappa Nu, the international honor society of the IEEE. The society refused her nomination because she was a woman, instead giving her a certificate as the best student in her class.

She became a junior engineer for Curtiss-Wright, working in the restricted research section on missile development. In 1948 she married Granino Arthur Korn, a German-born physicist, the son of physicist and inventor Arthur Korn. Granino was head of analysis at Curtiss-Wright, and because of the anti-nepotism rules then in place at Curtiss-Wright, this marriage caused her to lose her position there. A few years later, they both moved to Boeing in Seattle and she returned to work, on airplane engineering. The Korns co-founded an engineering consulting company in 1952, and Theresa Korn earned a master's degree in 1954 from the University of California, Los Angeles. In 1957, her husband became a professor of computer and electrical engineering at the University of Arizona, while Theresa Korn managed the consulting business and became active in Tucson society. After Granino Korn retired in 1983, the Korns moved to Wenatchee, Washington. Granino died on December 17, 2013, and Theresa Korn died from COVID-19 on April 9, 2020, in Wenatchee during the COVID-19 pandemic in Washington (state).

== Books ==
Korn was the author of:

- Trailblazer to Television: The story of Arthur Korn (with Elizabeth Korn, Charles Scribner's Sons, 1950)
- Electronic Analog Computers (D-C Analog Computers) (with Granino Korn, McGraw-Hill, 1952; 2nd ed., 1956; translated into German as Elektronische Analogierechenmaschinen, 1962)
- Mathematical Handbook for Scientists and Engineers: Definitions, Theorems, and Formulas for Reference and Review (with Granino Korn, McGraw-Hill, 1961; 2nd ed., 1968; Dover, 2000; translated into Russian as Справочник по математике для научных работников и инженеров, 1968, 1970, 1973, 1977, and 1984, (Note: In 1968, Nauka published a Russian translation of Korn's "Mathematical Handbook for Scientists and Engineers" as Справочник по математике для научных работников и инженеров in a print run of 100,000 units with the original intend to replace its long-selling handbook of mathematics for engineers and students of technical universities (Справочник по математике для инженеров и учащихся втузов), which had been published since 1945 by Ilya Nikolaevich Bronshtein (Илья Николаевич Бронштейн) and Konstantin Adolfovic Semendyayev (Константин Адольфович Семендяев) and was in its 11th Russian revision at the time, but needed considerable updates to meet new requirements. Since 1966, Nauka had been unsuccessfully approached with requests for updates by representatives of the East-German publisher BSB B. G. Teubner Verlagsgesellschaft, who were publishing a German translation of Nauka's title in huge quantities. This led Teubner to start working on an update of the volume on their own in 1970 and publish their completely reworked two-volume 19th German edition in 1979. That was successful enough to lead to a retranslation into Russian as well as into various other languages and caused a complex international publishing history up to the present (2013) centered around the German rather than the originally Russian work. The translation of Korn's work, however, was successful as well in the Russian market and was revised several times.) and into Polish as Matematyka dla pracowników naukowych i inżynierów, 1983)
- Electronic Analog and Hybrid Computers (with Granino Korn, McGraw-Hill, 1964; translated into Russian as Электронные аналоговые и аналого-цифровые вычислительные машины, 1967)
- Manual of Mathematics (abridged from Mathematical Handbook for Scientists and Engineers, with Granino Korn, McGraw-Hill, 1967)
