= Dmitrii Abramovich Raikov =

Russian mathematician (1905–1980)

Dmitrii Abramovich Raikov (Russian: Дмитрий Абрамович Райков, born 11 November 1905 in Odessa; died 1980 in Moscow) was a Russian mathematician who studied functional analysis.

Raikov studied in Odessa and Moscow, graduating in 1929. He was secretary of the Komsomol at Moscow State University and was active in the 1929–1930 campaign against the mathematician Dmitri Fyodorovich Egorov. At that time he and his fellow campaigners also rejected non-applied research, but this soon changed. In 1933, he was dismissed from the Communist Party on charges of Trotskyism and exiled to Voronezh, but was rehabilitated two years later and returned to Moscow. From 1938 to 1948, he was at the Mathematical Institute of the Academy of Sciences and in the Second World War in the militia. He was habilitated (Russian doctorate) in 1941 with Aleksandr Yakovlevich Khinchin at the Lomonosov University and in 1950 became professor. He taught at the Pedagogical Institute in Kostroma and from 1952 in Shuysky, before he taught from 1957 at the State Pedagogical University in Moscow. He also supervised students and taught at Lomonosov University.

Israel Gelfand and Raikov's 1943 theorem states that a locally compact group $G$ is completely determined by its (possibly infinite-dimensional) irreducible unitary representations: for every two elements $g,h$ of $G$ there is an irreducible unitary representation $\rho$ with $\rho (g) \neq \rho (h)$.

He also worked on probability theory, for example in 1938 he proved an equivalent of the Cramér's theorem for the Poisson distribution.

He edited the Russian editions of Nicolas Bourbaki's "Topology and Integration Theory" and translated numerous other mathematical works from Italian, English and German, for example the lectures on the theory of algebraic numbers by Erich Hecke, the book Moderne Algebra by Bartel Leendert van der Waerden, the Problems and Theorems in Analysis by George Pólya and Gábor Szegő, the introduction to the theory of Fourier integrals by Edward Charles Titchmarsh, the lectures on partial differential equations by Francesco Tricomi, the introduction to differential and integral calculus by Edmund Landau, the monograph on divergent series by Godfrey Harold Hardy and the finite dimensional vector spaces by Paul Halmos.

== Works ==
- with Israel Moiseevich Gelfand, Georgi Evgen'evich Shilov: Kommutative normierte Algebren (Commutative normalized algebras). Berlin, Deutscher Verlag der Wissenschaften, 1964 (first Russian, 1960).
- with Gelfand: Commutative normalized rings (Russian). Uspekhi Mat. Nauka, 1946
- Vector spaces. Groningen, Netherlands: P. Noordhoff, 1965 (first in Russian, 1962).
- with Michail Šamšonovič Calenko [Михаил Шамшонович Цаленко], Vladimir Borisovich Gisin [Владимир Борисович Гисин]: Ordered categories with involution. Warsaw, Mathematical Institute of the Academy of Sciences. 1984.
- One-dimensional mathematical analysis (Russian). Moscow, 1982.
- with E. Gusatinskaia: Analyse mathématique multidimensionnelle. Moscow: MIR, 1993 (first as Multidimensional Mathematical Analysis (Russian). Moscow, 1989).
- with Ilya Nikolaevich Bronshtein: Справочник по елементарнои математике, механике и физике (Russian) [Handbook of elementary mathematics, mechanics and physics]. Moscow, 1943.
- with Boris Nikolayevich Delaunay: Analytical Geometry (Russian). 2 volumes, Moscow, 1948, 1949.
