= Ilya Nikolaevich Bronshtein =

Russian mathematician (1903-1976)

Ilya Nikolaevich Bronshtein (Russian: Илья Николаевич Бронштейн, German: Ilja Nikolajewitsch Bronstein, also written as Bronschtein; born 1903, died 1976) was a Russian applied mathematician and historian of mathematics.

== Work and life ==
Bronshtein taught at the Moscow State Technical University (MAMI), then the State College of Mechanical Engineering, on the Chair of Advanced Mathematics established in 1939. He also collaborated at the Zhukovsky Central Aerohydrodynamic Institute.

With Dmitrii Abramovich Raikov, Bronshtein authored a Russian handbook on elementary mathematics, mechanics and physics (Справочник по елементарнои математике, механике и физике), which was published in 1943.

Bronshtein is known as the author of a handbook of mathematics for engineers and students of technical universities, which he wrote together with Konstantin Adolfovic Semendyayev around the 1939/1940 timeframe. Hot lead typesetting for the work had already started when the Siege of Leningrad prohibited further development and the print matrices were relocated. After the war, they were first considered lost, but could be found again years later, so that the first edition of Справочник по математике для инженеров и учащихся втузов could finally be published in 1945. This was a major success and went through eleven editions in Russia and was translated into various languages, including German and English, until the publisher Nauka planned to replace it with a translation of the American Mathematical Handbook for Scientists and Engineers by Granino and Theresa M. Korn in 1968. However, in a parallel development starting in 1970, the so called "Bronshtein and Semendyayev" (BS), which had been translated into German in 1958, underwent a major overhaul by a team of East-German authors around Günter Grosche, Viktor & Dorothea Ziegler (of University of Leipzig), to which Bronshtein himself could no longer contribute due to reasons of age. This was published in 1979 and spawned translations into many other languages as well, including a retranslation into Russian and an English edition. In 1986, the 13th Russian edition was published. The German 'Wende' and the later reunification led to considerable changes in the publishing environment in Germany between 1989 and 1991, which eventually resulted in two independent German publishing branches by Eberhard Zeidler (published 1995–2013) and by Gerhard Musiol & Heiner Mühlig (published 1992–2020) to expand and maintain the work up to the present, again with translations into many other languages including English.

== Publications ==
- "О мнимых линейных Wurf'ax" [On Imaginary Linear Throws]. Matematicheskii Sbornik (Математический сборник) (in Russian). 34 (1): 37–47. 1927.
- With Semendyayev: "Handbook of Mathematics for Engineers and Students of Technical Universities" (Справочник по математике для инженеров и учащихся втузов), Moscow, 1945

== See also ==
- Bronshtein and Semendyayev (BS)
- Konstantin Adolfovic Semendyayev
