= Wolfgang Hackbusch =

German mathematician (born 1948)

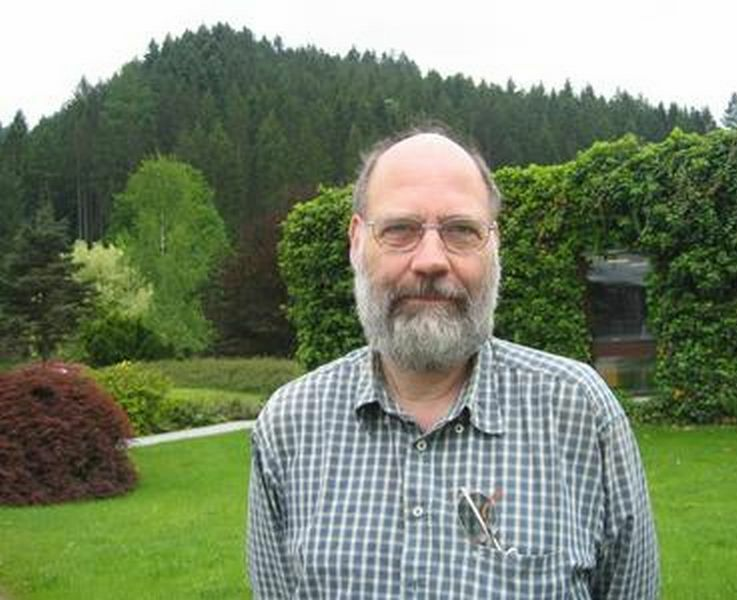
- Born: 24 October 1948 (age 76); Westerstede, Lower Saxony, Ger
- Occupation: Mathematician

Wolfgang Hackbusch (born 24 October 1948 in Westerstede, Lower Saxony) is a German mathematician, known for his pioneering research in multigrid methods and later hierarchical matrices, a concept generalizing the fast multipole method. He was a professor at the University of Kiel and is currently one of the directors of the Max Planck Institute for Mathematics in the Sciences in Leipzig.

== Awards and honors ==
- 1994 Gottfried Wilhelm Leibniz Prize
- 1996 Brouwer Medal
- 1998 Plenary Speaker of the International Congress of Mathematicians
- 2020 Gumin Prize for Mathematics

== Publications ==
- Multi-grid methods and applications, 1985, Springer Berlin, ISBN 3-540-12761-5; 2013 pbk reprint
- Elliptic Differential Equations: Theory and Numerical Treatment, 1992, Springer Berlin, ISBN 978-3-540-54822-5
- Iterative Solution of Large Sparse Systems of Equations, 1993, Springer Berlin, ISBN 978-0-387-94064-9
- Integral Equations: Theory and Numerical Treatment, 1995, Birkhäuser, ISBN 978-3-7643-2871-9
- Hierarchische Matrizen: Algorithmen und Analysis, 2009, Springer Berlin, ISBN 978-3-642-00221-2
- Tensor spaces and numerical tensor calculus, 2012, Springer, Heidelberg ISBN 978-3-642-28026-9 ISBN 978-3-642-28027-6
- The Concept of Stability in Numerical Mathematics, 2014, Springer, Leipzig ISBN 978-3-642-39385-3
