= Siegfried Gottwald =

German mathematician (1943–2015)

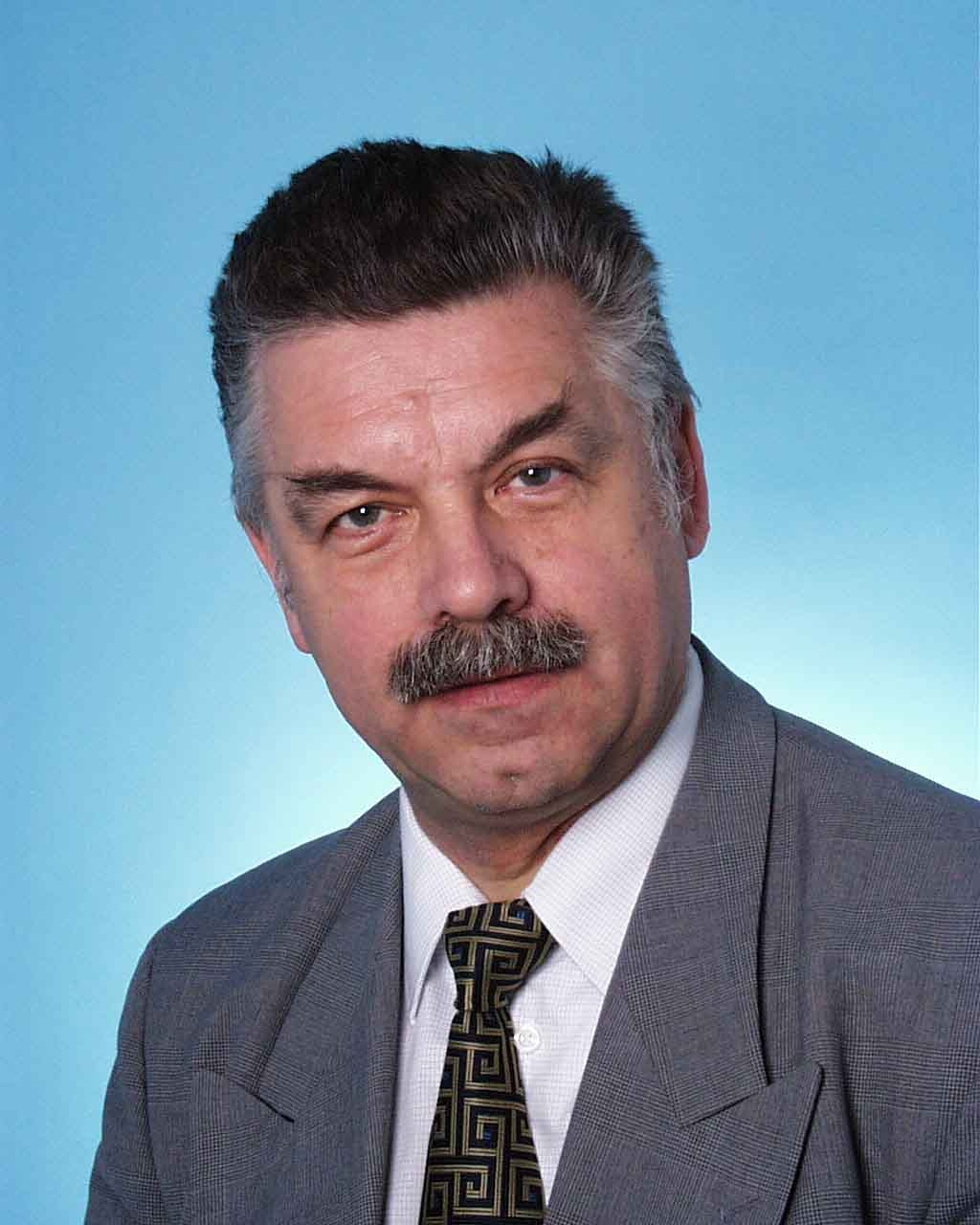
- Siegfried Gottwald, 2004
- Born: 30 March 1943; Limbach, Saxony, Germany
- Died: 20 September 2015 (aged 72)
- Education: University of Leipzig
- Occupations: mathematician, logician, historian of science
- Known for: fuzzy sets, history of mathematics
- Spouse: married
- Children: 3

Siegfried Johannes Gottwald (30 March 1943 – 20 September 2015) was a German mathematician, logician and historian of science.

== Life and work ==
Gottwald was born in Limbach, Saxony in 1943. From 1961 to 1966, he studied mathematics at the University of Leipzig, where he was awarded his doctor title in 1969 and his habilitation in 1977.

He was a tenured professor of non-classical and mathematical logic at the University of Leipzig where he taught from 1972 to his retirement in 2008. His main research areas are fuzzy sets and fuzzy methodologies, many-valued logic and the history of mathematics.

He published several books on many-valued logic and on fuzzy sets and their applications, a co-authored textbook on calculus, and a reader in the history of logic. He also contributed to the German biographical dictionary of mathematicians, Lexikon berühmter Mathematiker.

Gottwald was Deputy Dean of the Faculty of Social Sciences and Philosophy at the University of Leipzig for several years. He was married with three children.

== Published books ==
- Bock, Hans; Gottwald, Siegfried; Mühlig, Rolf-Peter (1973). Zum Sprachgebrauch in der Mathematik ein Lernprogramm mit 133 Lerneinheiten (in German). Düsseldorf. ISBN 978-3-513-00823-7. OCLC 74122753.
- S. Gottwald, P. Günther, K. Beyer, V. Wünsch: Grundkurs Analysis. Parts 1–4, Math.-Naturwiss. Bibl., Vols. 53–56, Teubner: Leipzig 1972–74.
- Berka, Karel; Kreiser, Lothar (31 December 1986). Logik-Texte. De Gruyter. doi:10.1515/9783112645826. ISBN 978-3-11-264582-6.
- Gottwald, Siegfried (1989). Mehrwertige Logik : eine Einführung in Theorie und Anwendungen (in German). Berlin: Akademie-Verlag. ISBN 3-05-000765-6. OCLC 21997523.
- Bandemer, H.; Gottwald, S. (31 December 1989). Einführung in FUZZY-Methoden. De Gruyter. doi:10.1515/9783112590881. ISBN 978-3-11-259088-1. S2CID 247869463.
- Gottwald, Siegfried (1993). Fuzzy sets and fuzzy logic : the foundations of application--from a mathematical point of view. Wiesbaden: Teknea. ISBN 3-528-05311-9. OCLC 29878135.
- Bandemer, Hans; Gottwald, Siegfried (1995). Fuzzy sets, fuzzy logic, fuzzy methods with applications. Chichester: J. Wiley. ISBN 0-471-95636-8. OCLC 32713925.
- Gottwald, Siegfried (2001). A treatise on many-valued logics. Baldock, Hertfordshire, England: Research Studies Press. ISBN 0-86380-262-1. OCLC 44162540.
