= Akademische Verlagsgesellschaft =

(East-)German publishing house (1906–1991)

The Akademische Verlagsgesellschaft (AVG, AVg, Aka, (Note: As the Akademische Verlagsgesellschaft's company logo was AVG, the usage of the abbreviation AV in Schneider could have been a typographical error. Seiffert uses AV for Akademie Verlag. Fredriksson uses Aka for both, the original Akademische Verlagsgesellschaft and the new AKA-Verlag, of which he is one of the owners. According to him (but unsourced in historical documents so far), Aka was already used by Menkes Daniël "Daan" Frank, who absolved his training at Akademische Verlagsgesellschaft in the 1930s.) AV; English: Academic publishing company) in Leipzig was an important German academic publisher, which was founded in 1906.

The original Jewish owners of the publishing house and key employees were expropriated during the time of the Nazi regime, emigrated and founded new scientific publishing houses in other countries. The publishing house was then named Akademische Verlagsgesellschaft Becker & Erler.

After World War II, in the German Democratic Republic (GDR/DDR) the Leipzig branch of the publishing house was transformed into Akademische Verlagsgesellschaft Geest & Portig in 1947 and 1951. This was dissolved in 1991 as a consequence of the German reunification.

Between 1953 and 1983, another Akademische Verlagsgesellschaft seeing itself as the legal successor of the original company existed in the Federal Republic of Germany (FRG/BRD) in Frankfurt am Main and Wiesbaden.

Today, there are two German publishing houses claiming to stand in the tradition of the Akademische Verlagsgesellschaft, AULA-Verlag and AKA-Verlag, although legally they are new and independent foundations.

== History ==
Gustav Fock founded an antiquarian bookshop in Leipzig in 1879. Leo Salomon Jolowicz (born 12 August 1868 in Posen; died 7 June 1940 in Leipzig) took over the bookshop in 1898 and turned it into the largest and best-known scientific antiquarian bookshop in Germany.

On 4 April 1906, Jolowicz then founded the Akademische Verlagsgesellschaft with Gustav Rothschild (procurator at the Fock bookshop) und Paul Werthauer, who left in 1914 already.

A decade after being founded, the antiquarian bookshop Fock had already opened department stores in New York and San Francisco, later also in Tokyo. In 1991, the renowned Buchhandlung Mayer & Müller in Berlin, who also had a scientific program and distributed many American scientific journals, was added to the portfolio. The C. F. Winter'sche Verlagshandlung in Leipzig followed in 1923.

The publishing house became one of the best-known scientific publishers, publishing well-known journals such as the Zeitschrift für physikalische Chemie (Journal of physical chemistry, 1887 introduced by Wilhelm Ostwald and Jacobus Henricus van 't Hoff, taken over from Verlag Wilhelm Engelmann in Leipzig, in 1920), the Handbuch der Experimentalphysik (Handbook of experimental physics) by Friedrich Harms and Wilhelm Wien (26 volumes with a total of 25000 pages and 9700 images, 1926 to 1937, meant as competitor to Handbuch der Physik by Springer-Verlag), the Handbuch der Radiologie (Handbook of radiology) (6 volumes, 1913 to 1934), Rabenhorst's Kryptogamen-Flora (Rabenhorst's cryptogam flora), Bronns Klassen und Ordnungen des Tierreichs (Bronn's classes and orders of the animal kingdom), Ergebnisse der Enzymforschung (Results of enzyme research) and Ergebnisse der Vitamin- und Hormonforschung (Results of vitamin and hormone research).

Among many others, the list of authors included Wilhelm Ostwald (i.e. Handbuch der allgemeinen Chemie, since 1918), Svante Arrhenius (Theorien der Chemie, 1906), Pierre Curie and Marie Curie, William Ramsay, Arnold Sommerfeld (Lectures on theoretical physics) und Hendrik Antoon Lorentz. From 1921, Akademische Verlagsgesellschaft also published a well-known series of new editions of scientific classics Ostwalds Klassiker der exakten Wissenschaften (taken over from Verlag Wilhelm Engelmann in 1919). Other journals taken over from Engelmann were Zeitschrift für wissenschaftliche Zoologie (founded in 1849, oldest German zoological journal, taken over in 1923), Zoologischer Anzeiger (founded in 1878, taken over in 1924) and Jahrbuch für Morphologie und mikroskopische Anatomie (founded in 1876, taken over in 1924). The publisher also took over in 1926 Gerlands Beiträge zur Geophysik (founded in 1876 by Buchhandlung Gustav Fock, before 1918 issued by Engelmann), Folia haematologica (founded in 1904 by Verlag W. Klinckhardt, taken over in 1927), the periodical Der Zoologische Garten (founded in 1859 by Verlag Mahlau und Waldschmidt in Frankfurt am Main, and Zeitschrift der Zoologischen Gesellschaft in Frankfurt am Main, taken over in 1929), and in 1930 Hochfrequenztechnik und Elektroakustik (Jahrbuch der drahtlosen Telegraphie und Telephonie, founded in 1907, originally by Ambrosius Barth in Leipzig, then issued by M. Krayn in Hamburg). The successors of the publishing house in West and East Germany continued this tradition. For the most part Jolowicz published natural sciences, medicine and mathematics, but also Hebraica and Judaica.

Leo Jolowicz's son-in-law Kurt Jacoby (born 1893 in Insterburg; died August 1968 in New York) was also involved in the expansion of the publishing house. He had previously worked for Ferdinand Springer and became deputy manager and another owner at Akademische Verlagsgesellschaft in 1923. In 1930, Jolowicz's son Walter Jolowicz (1908–1996, who later called himself Walter J. Johnson after emigrating to the USA) joined the business as well.

In the early 1930s, the publishing house published 26 journals. Some 70% of the revenue were generated in foreign markets, which helped to solidify the business despite decreasing profits. In 1933, Akademische Verlagsgesellschaft had a revenue of 1 million Reichsmark and a profit of 337,000 Reichsmark.

When the National Socialists came to power, the publishing house was "aryanized" (Jolowicz was a Jew) and Jolowicz was gradually pushed out of the business. In 1937, he finally left the publishing house. He applied for emigration in 1939, but was unable to leave Germany and died in 1940, possibly by suicide.

His son Walter and his son-in-law Kurt Jacoby were sent to a concentration camp in 1938, but were then able to leave Germany and emigrated via Russia, Japan and other countries to New York, USA, where they arrived in 1941 and 1942, respectively, and founded the publishing house Academic Press. Other emigrants like Maurits Dekker and former members of Akademische Verlagsgesellschaft like Erich Simon Proskauer (1903–1991) had already founded Interscience in New York in 1940. The Dutch Menkes Daniël "Daan" Frank (1913–1995), who had absolved his training at Akademische Verlagsgesellschaft since 1934, joined the new publishing house North Holland Publishing Company (later part of Elsevier) in 1936 to build it up following Akademische Verlagsgesellschaft's model.

Johannes Geest and Felix Portig followed Jolowicz as publishing directors. In 1940, however, their names were soon replaced by Walter Becker and Willy Erler in the commercial register. Formally, they were a limited partnership (KG) as Akademische Verlagsgesellschaft Becker & Erler KG.

The book inventory of Gustav Fock GmbH burned down in a bomb attack on Leipzig on 4 December 1943.

After World War II, Geest and Portig re-established the Akademische Verlagsgesellschaft in the Soviet occupation zone on 25 February 1947, and later received a renewed license from East Germany on 26 October 1951. Johannes Geest died in 1947 and his heiress Marianne Lotze took over the shares as a Kommanditist. After Portig's death in January 1953 and the "Republikflucht" of Lotze, the majority of the shares in the KG were taken over by the state. In 1959, these were transferred to VEB Gustav Fischer Verlag.

From 1964 onwards, the Akademische Verlagsgesellschaft was effectively affiliated to the B. G. Teubner Verlag as far as publishing activities were concerned. Together, they continued to publish Ostwalds Klassiker der exakten Wissenschaften and the series of biographies of important scientists. In addition, Akademische Verlagsgesellschaft Geest & Portig also published numerous university textbooks in the GDR (such as the Grundriss der anorganischen Chemie (Basic plan of inorganic chemistry) by a collective of authors, which reached a circulation of 100000).

The remaining heiress Gertrud Margarete Portig was pushed out of the company entirely by 1972 when the publishing house became the property of VEB Gustav Fischer Verlag. However, the publishing programs of Gustav Fischer Verlag and Akademische Verlagsgesellschaft were quite different.

Newly founded in December 1953 as a consequence of East-Germany's occupation of the publishing house in Leipzig, there was another Akademische Verlagsgesellschaft m.b.H. in Frankfurt am Main aiming as the original publisher's successor in West Germany. It was later situated in Wiesbaden and since 1975 owned by the publisher family Steiner. It existed until 1983.

After the German reunification, the East-German Akademische Verlagsgesellschaft Geest & Portig fell to the Treuhandanstalt, which closed the publishing house in 1991. Surviving archive material of the publisher is preserved in the Sächsisches Staatsarchiv, Staatsarchiv Leipzig under inventory 21091 Akademische Verlagsgesellschaft Geest & Portig KG, Leipzig.

== Other publishers ==
The Aula-Verlagsgesellschaft mbH aka AULA-Verlag in Wiebelsheim, Germany, was founded in 1982 and claims to have been originally based on usage rights of the older Akademische Verlagsgesellschaft, the Akademische Verlagsgesellschaft Athenaion (the successor of Albert Hachfeld's Athenaion Verlag in Potsdam) and the Athenäum Verlag. Since autumn 1993, AULA-Verlag works with the Limpert Verlag and the Quelle & Meyer Verlagsgesellschaft mbH & Co. in a publishing cooperation. (The Wiebelsheim publisher must not be confused with the unrelated namesake Aula-Verlag in Graz, Austria, an extreme right publisher.)

In 1996, the Akademische Verlagsgesellschaft AKA GmbH aka AKA Verlag was founded. This publisher claims to continue the tradition of the former Akademische Verlagsgesellschaft as well.

== See also ==
- Edition Leipzig, was hosted at Akademische Verlagsgesellschaft in 1960
