= Deutscher Verlag der Wissenschaften =

East-German publishing house (1954–1995)

Deutscher Verlag der Wissenschaften (DVW; transl. German Publisher of Sciences) was a scientific publishing house in the former German Democratic Republic (GDR/DDR).

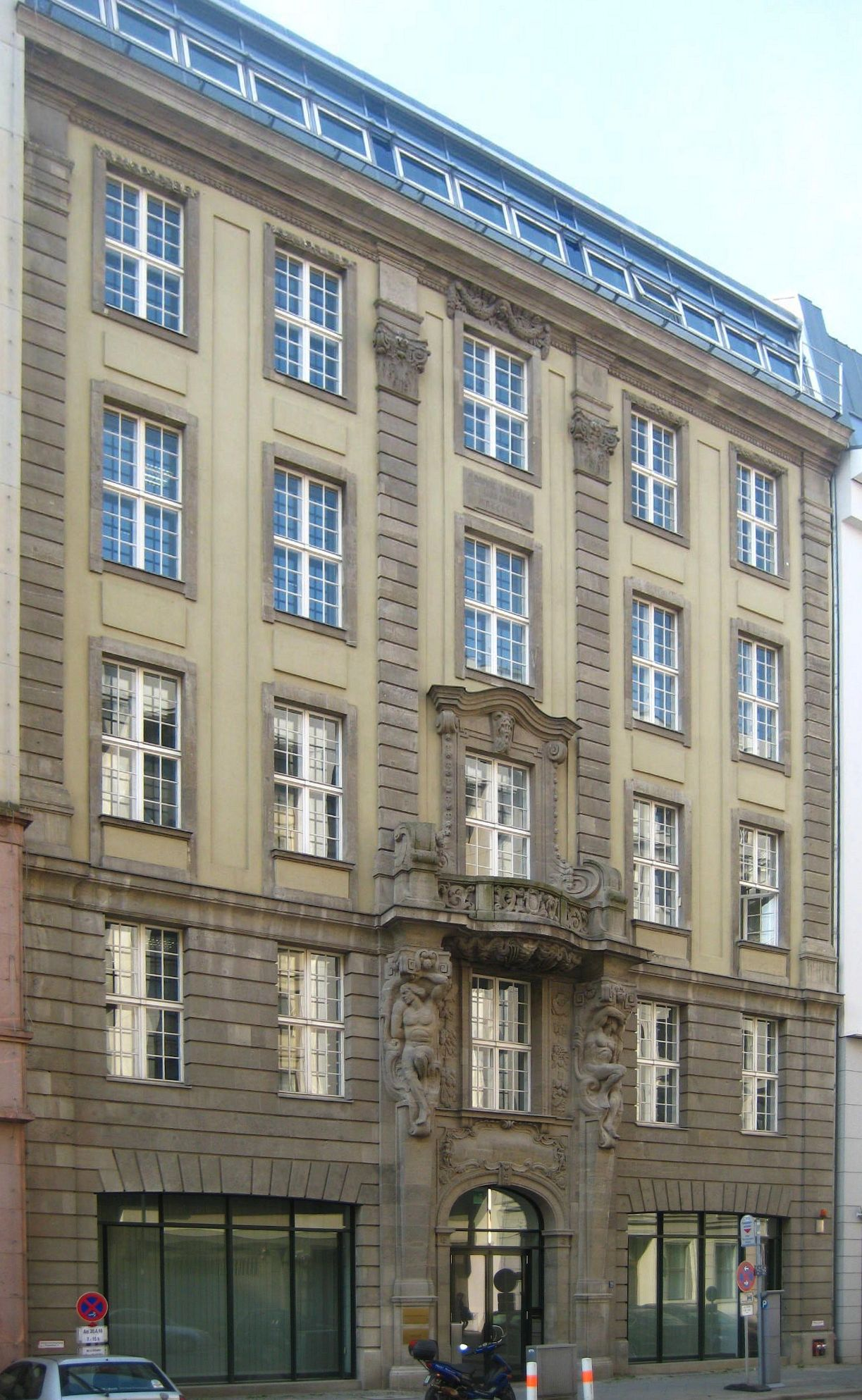
Berlin-Mitte, Taubenstrasse 10, former Patzenhofer Brauerei

Situated in Berlin, DVW was founded as Volkseigener Betrieb (VEB) on 1 January 1954 as the successor of the main department of "university literature" of the publisher Volk und Wissen (VWV). During the first ten years, DVW, for the most part, published mathematical and scientific literature aimed at university education. About 780 titles were introduced with a total print run of some 3.7 million books. In 1964, DVW took over parts of the programme of Rütten & Loening and also published textbooks on topics of philosophy, history and sociology. DVW was among the publishers of the Mathematische Schülerbücherei (MSB).

Whilst more than a third of the production was distributed into Western foreign countries, the publisher still did not make a profit due to the fixed low book prices, politically motivated so called Preisanordnungen (PAOs) dictated by the East German government. In 1988, with a turnaround of 8.4 million East German mark, DVW lost 1.3 million East German mark.

During the German reunification, the publishing house was converted into a GmbH on 30 June 1990, and cost-cutting measures were implemented. In October 1991, DVW was sold to Verlagsgruppe Hüthig Heidelberg with some assets being transferred to other publishing houses. In February 1992, DVW stopped all its activities. The GmbH went into liquidation and was dissolved in 1995.

The DVW archive was transferred to a depot of the DV-Informationssysteme und Service GmbH as well as to the Bundesarchiv Berlin. Documents related to the production of scientific publications remained with Hüthig.

== See also ==
- Verlag Harri Deutsch
