= Exmatriculation =

Removal of a student's name when they leave a university

Exmatriculation is the removal of a student's name from the list of current students when they leave a university. It refers to the deregistering or unenrolling of a student as a result of graduation, expulsion, inability to pay school fees, meet academic progress requirements or their self withdrawal from the university.

== After exmatriculation ==
In cases of voluntary withdrawal, some schools, depending on their various conditions, may reimburse part of the fees if the student applies for it. Unlike after a leave of absence, continuation of your studies following voluntary exmatriculation may be faced with difficulties.

Expelled students are usually barred from being readmitted into the university from which they were exmatriculated. However, in different cases, there are various exceptions and conditions for reapplying into the same university. There have also been cases of students whose expulsion was welcomed by the public's pressure and protests to revert it. Students who were exmatriculated due to failure to meet payment deadlines or continuous academic progress can also apply to be readmitted within a period of time depending on the school.
