= Konstantin Semendyayev =

Russian engineer and mathematician

- Born: Konstantin Adolfovich Semendyayev; 9 December 1908; Simferopol, Russian Empire
- Died: 15 November 1988 (aged 79); Moscow, Soviet Union
- Occupations: Mathematician, scientist

Konstantin Adolfovich Semendyayev (Russian: Константин Адольфович Семендяев; 9 December 1908, Simferopol – 15 November 1988, Moscow) was a Soviet engineer and applied mathematician. He worked in the department of applied mathematics of the Steklov Institute in Moscow. He carried out pioneering work in the area of numerical weather forecasting in the Soviet Union.

== Biography ==
Semendyayev studied at the Lomonosov University with the degree in 1929 and was then at various higher schools. From 1931 to 1936 he was in the Faculty of Mathematics and Mechanics at Lomonosov University. He habilitated in 1940 (Russian doctorate). From 1936 he headed the Department of Mathematical Instruments of the Academy of Sciences of the Soviet Union. He was evacuated to Kazan with the institute during World War II. After World War II, he headed a department for numerical calculations at the Steklov Institute in Moscow and, when the Institute for Applied Mathematics at the Steklov Institute was founded in 1953, his group became the Department of Gas Dynamics. In 1961, he became deputy head of the Institute for Applied Mathematics. In 1963, he went to the Hydrometeorological Center of the USSR, where he led the programming work. He also supported the teaching of applied mathematics at various Moscow educational institutions.

Semendyayev is known as the co-author of a handbook of mathematics for engineers and students of technical universities, which he wrote together with Ilya Nikolaevich Bronshtein around the 1939/1940 timeframe. Hot lead typesetting for the work had already started when the Siege of Leningrad prohibited further development and the print matrices were relocated. After the war, they were first considered lost, but could be found again years later, so that the first edition of Справочник по математике для инженеров и учащихся втузов could finally be published in 1945. This was a major success and went through eleven editions in Russia and was translated into various languages, including German and English, until the publisher Nauka planned to replace it with a translation of the American Mathematical Handbook for Scientists and Engineers by Granino and Theresa M. Korn in 1968. However, in a parallel development starting in 1970, the so called "Bronshtein and Semendyayev" (BS), which had been translated into German in 1958, underwent a major overhaul by a team of East German authors around Günter Grosche, Viktor & Dorothea Ziegler (of University of Leipzig), to which Semendyayev contributed as well (a section on computer systems and numerical harmonic analysis). This was published in 1979 and spawned translations into many other languages as well, including a retranslation into Russian and an English edition. In 1986, the 13th Russian edition was published. The German 'Wende' and the later reunification led to considerable changes in the publishing environment in Germany between 1989 and 1991, which eventually resulted in two independent German publishing branches by Eberhard Zeidler (published 1995–2013) and by Gerhard Musiol & Heiner Mühlig (published 1992–2020) to expand and maintain the work up to the present, again with translations into many other languages including English.

Semendyayev has been on the editorial board of the Russian journal Journal of Numerical Mathematics and Mathematical Physics (Журнал вычислительной математики и математической физики) since its inception.

== Awards and honors ==
- Three Stalin Prizes (1949, 1951, 1953)
- Three Orders of Lenin (1949, 1955, 1956)
- Order of the Red Banner of Labour (1953)
- Jubilee Medal "In Commemoration of the 100th Anniversary of the Birth of Vladimir Ilyich Lenin"
- Lenin Prize

== Publications ==
- With Bronshtein: "Handbook of Mathematics for Engineers and Students of Technical Universities" (Справочник по математике для инженеров и учащихся втузов), Moscow, 1945

== See also ==
- Bronshtein and Semendyayev (BS)
- Ilya Nikolaevich Bronshtein
