= Eberhard Zeidler (mathematician) =

German mathematician

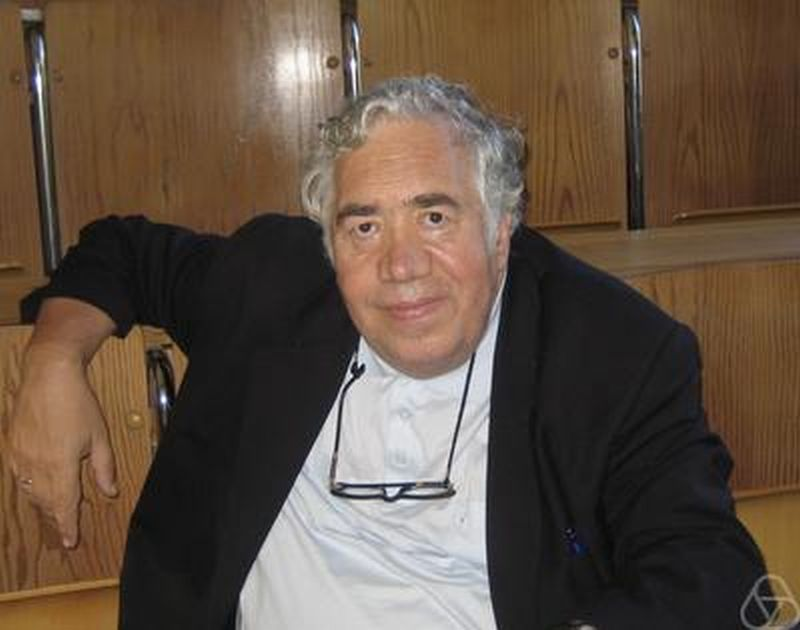
Eberhard Zeidler, Bonn, 2006

Eberhard Hermann Erich Zeidler (6 October 1940 in Leipzig, Germany – 18 November 2016 ibid) was a German mathematician, who worked primarily in the field of non-linear functional analysis.

== Life and work ==
After attending the Leipzig Humboldtschule Eberhard Zeidler began studying mathematics at the University of Leipzig in 1959. In 1961, he was exmatriculated because of critical statements, and was forced to work as a transport worker and absolve his military service in the East-German's NVA. In 1964, he was allowed to continue his studies. In 1967, he received his Dr. rer. nat. (PhD) with his work "Über eine Klasse nichtlinearer singulärer Randwertaufgaben der Funktionentheorie mit Symmetrieverhalten" under Herbert Beckert.

In 1970, he was appointed to habilitation and became a lecturer for analysis at the University of Leipzig. From 1974 to 1996 he was full professor for analysis.

In the winter semester of 1979–1980, Eberhard Zeidler was a visiting professor at the University of Wisconsin–Madison (USA).

From 1992 to 1996, he was head of the DFG research group on "Nichtlineare Funktionalanalysis und ihre Anwendungen" (Nonlinear functional analysis and its applications), and from 1992 to 2000 he was a member of the scientific advisory board of the Mathematisches Forschungsinstitut Oberwolfach.

In 1996, Eberhard Zeidler became the first managing director of the Max Planck Institute for Mathematics in the Sciences when it was founded in Leipzig. In 2003, he gave up the management, but remained director. He retired in October 2007.

Eberhard Zeidler has been a member of the German Academy of Sciences Leopoldina since 1994. Also, he was one of the founding members of the Foundation Board and the Foundation Advisory Board of the Stiftung Benedictus Gotthelf Teubner.

== Awards and honors ==
- 2005: International symposium of the Max Planck Institute for Mathematics in the Natural Sciences and the University of Leipzig on the occasion of the 65th birthday of Eberhard Zeidler
- 2006: Alfried Krupp Science Prize
- 2014-02-21: Stiftung Benedictus Gotthelf Teubner Science Prize of the Teubner Foundation for the Promotion of Mathematical Sciences

== Publications ==
- Über eine Klasse nichtlinearer singulärer Randwertaufgaben der Funktionentheorie mit Symmetrieverhalten. Dissertation. Universität Leipzig, Leipzig, 1967.
- Zur Theorie und Praxis einer Klasse freier Randwertprobleme der ebenen Hydrodynamik. Habilitationsschrift. Universität Leipzig, Leipzig, 1970. Als Festschrift Herrn Prof. Dr. phil. habil. Herbert Beckert zum 50. Geburtstag. Akademie-Verlag, Berlin, 1971.
- Vorlesungen über nichtlineare Funktionalanalysis. 3 Volumes. Teubner, Leipzig.
  - Volume 1: Fixpunktsätze. 1976. 3rd ed., 1980.
  - Volume 2: Monotone Operatoren. 1977. 3rd ed., 1981.
  - Volume 3: Variationsmethoden und Optimierung. 1978. 2nd ed., 1982.
  - English edition: Nonlinear Functional Analysis and Its Applications. Springer, New York, 1986–1997.
- with Günter Grosche (ed.): Teubner-Taschenbuch der Mathematik. Begründet von I. N. Bronstein und K. A. Semendjajew. Teubner, Stuttgart.
  - Volume 1: 1996, ISBN 3-8154-2001-6.
  - Volume 2: Ergänzende Kapitel zu Taschenbuch der Mathematik – Neubearbeitung von I. N. Bronstein und K. A. Semendjajew. 2003, ISBN 3-519-21008-8.
  - English edition: Oxford Users' Guide to Mathematics. Oxford University Press, Oxford, New York, 2004, ISBN 0-19-850763-1.
- Applied Functional Analysis. Springer, New York, 1995.
  - Volume 1: Applications to Mathematical Physics. ISBN 0-387-94442-7.
  - Volume 2: Main Principles and Their Applications. ISBN 0-387-94422-2.
- with Hans-Peter Gittel, Jerzy Kijowski: The relativistic dynamics of the combined particle field system in nonlinear renormalized electrodynamics. Max-Planck-Institut für Mathematik in den Naturwissenschaften Leipzig, Leipzig, 1997.
- Quantum Field Theory. Springer, Berlin.
  - Volume 1: Basics in Mathematics and Physics. 2006, ISBN 3-540-34762-3.
  - Volume 2: Quantum Electrodynamics. 2008, ISBN 978-3-540-85376-3.
  - Volume 3: Gauge Theory. 2011, ISBN 978-3-642-22420-1.
  - Volume 4–6: unfinished.

== See also ==
- Bronshtein and Semendyayev
