= List of publications in mathematics =

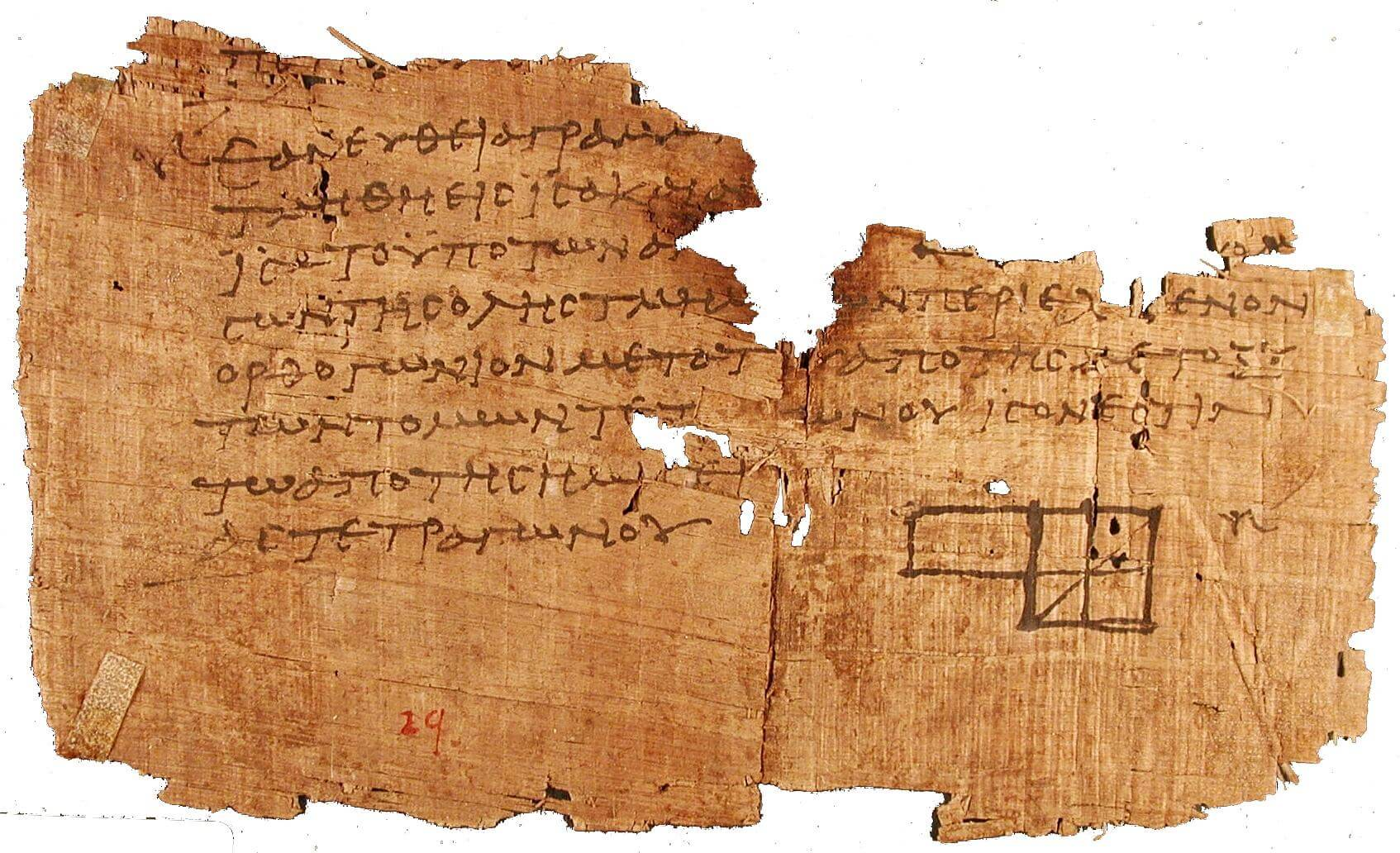
One of the oldest surviving fragments of Euclid's Elements, found at Oxyrhynchus and dated to circa AD 100. The diagram accompanies Book II, Proposition 5.

This is a list of publications in mathematics, organized by field.

Some reasons a particular publication might be regarded as important:

- Topic creator – A publication that created a new topic
- Breakthrough – A publication that changed scientific knowledge significantly
- Influence – A publication which has significantly influenced the world or has had a massive impact on the teaching of mathematics.

Among published compilations of important publications in mathematics are Landmark writings in Western mathematics 1640–1940 by Ivor Grattan-Guinness and A Source Book in Mathematics by David Eugene Smith.

== Algebra ==
=== Theory of equations ===
==== Baudhayana Sulba Sutra ====
- Baudhayana (8th century BCE)

With linguistic evidence suggesting this text to have been written between the 8th and 5th centuries century BCE, this is one of the oldest mathematical texts. It laid the foundations of Indian mathematics and was influential in South Asia. It was primarily a geometrical text and also contained some important developments, including the list of Pythagorean triples, geometric solutions of linear and quadratic equations and square root of 2.

==== The Nine Chapters on the Mathematical Art ====
- The Nine Chapters on the Mathematical Art (10th–2nd century BCE)

Contains the earliest description of Gaussian elimination for solving system of linear equations, it also contains method for finding square root and cubic root.

==== Arithmetica ====
- Diophantus (3rd century CE)

Contains the collection of 130 algebraic problems giving numerical solutions of determinate equations (those with a unique solution) and indeterminate equations.

==== Haidao Suanjing ====
- Liu Hui (220-280 CE)

Contains the application of right angle triangles for survey of depth or height of distant objects.

==== Sunzi Suanjing ====
- Sunzi (5th century CE)

Contains the earliest description of Chinese remainder theorem.

==== Aryabhatiya ====
- Aryabhata (499 CE)

The text contains 33 verses covering mensuration (kṣetra vyāvahāra), arithmetic and geometric progressions, gnomon / shadows (shanku-chhAyA), simple, quadratic, simultaneous, and indeterminate equations. It also gave the modern standard algorithm for solving first-order diophantine equations.

==== Jigu Suanjing ====
Jigu Suanjing (626 CE)

This book by Tang dynasty mathematician Wang Xiaotong contains the world's earliest third order equation.

==== Brāhmasphuṭasiddhānta ====
- Brahmagupta (628 CE)

Contained rules for manipulating both negative and positive numbers, rules for dealing with the number zero, a method for computing square roots, and general methods of solving linear and some quadratic equations, solution to Pell's equation.

==== Al-Kitāb al-mukhtaṣar fī hīsāb al-ğabr wa'l-muqābala ====
- Muhammad ibn Mūsā al-Khwārizmī (820 CE)

The first book on the systematic algebraic solutions of linear and quadratic equations by the Persian scholar Muhammad ibn Mūsā al-Khwārizmī. The book is considered to be the foundation of modern algebra and Islamic mathematics. The word "algebra" itself is derived from the al-Jabr in the title of the book.

=== Līlāvatī, Siddhānta Shiromani and Bijaganita ===
One of the major treatises on mathematics by Bhāskara II provides the solution for indeterminate equations of 1st and 2nd order.

==== Yigu yanduan ====
- Li Ye (13th century)

Contains the earliest invention of 4th order polynomial equation.

==== Mathematical Treatise in Nine Sections ====
- Qin Jiushao (1247)

This 13th-century book contains the earliest complete solution of 19th-century Horner's method of solving high order polynomial equations (up to 10th order). It also contains a complete solution of Chinese remainder theorem, which predates Euler and Gauss by several centuries.

==== Ceyuan haijing ====
- Li Zhi (1248)

Contains the application of high order polynomial equation in solving complex geometry problems.

==== Jade Mirror of the Four Unknowns ====
- Zhu Shijie (1303)

Contains the method of establishing system of high order polynomial equations of up to four unknowns.

==== Ars Magna ====
- Gerolamo Cardano (1545)

Otherwise known as The Great Art, provided the first published methods for solving cubic and quartic equations (due to Scipione del Ferro, Niccolò Fontana Tartaglia, and Lodovico Ferrari), and exhibited the first published calculations involving non-real complex numbers.

==== Vollständige Anleitung zur Algebra ====
- Leonhard Euler (1770)

Also known as Elements of Algebra, Euler's textbook on elementary algebra is one of the first to set out algebra in the modern form we would recognize today. The first volume deals with determinate equations, while the second part deals with Diophantine equations. The last section contains a proof of Fermat's Last Theorem for the case n = 3, making some valid assumptions regarding $\mathbb{Q}(\sqrt{-3})$ that Euler did not prove.

==== Demonstratio nova theorematis omnem functionem algebraicam rationalem integram unius variabilis in factores reales primi vel secundi gradus resolvi posse ====
- Carl Friedrich Gauss (1799)

Gauss's doctoral dissertation, which contained a widely accepted (at the time) but incomplete proof of the fundamental theorem of algebra.

=== Abstract algebra ===
==== Group theory ====
===== Réflexions sur la résolution algébrique des équations =====
- Joseph Louis Lagrange (1770)

The title means "Reflections on the algebraic solutions of equations". Made the prescient observation that the roots of the Lagrange resolvent of a polynomial equation are tied to permutations of the roots of the original equation, laying a more general foundation for what had previously been an ad hoc analysis and helping motivate the later development of the theory of permutation groups, group theory, and Galois theory. The Lagrange resolvent also introduced the discrete Fourier transform of order 3.

==== Articles Publiés par Galois dans les Annales de Mathématiques ====
- Journal de Mathematiques pures et Appliquées, II (1846)

Posthumous publication of the mathematical manuscripts of Évariste Galois by Joseph Liouville. Included are Galois' papers Mémoire sur les conditions de résolubilité des équations par radicaux and Des équations primitives qui sont solubles par radicaux.

==== Traité des substitutions et des équations algébriques ====
- Camille Jordan (1870)

Online version: Online version

Traité des substitutions et des équations algébriques (Treatise on Substitutions and Algebraic Equations). The first book on group theory, giving a then-comprehensive study of permutation groups and Galois theory. In this book, Jordan introduced the notion of a simple group and epimorphism (which he called isomorphisme mériédrique), proved part of the Jordan–Hölder theorem, and discussed matrix groups over finite fields as well as the Jordan normal form.

==== Theorie der Transformationsgruppen ====
- Sophus Lie, Friedrich Engel (1888–1893).

Publication data: 3 volumes, B.G. Teubner, Verlagsgesellschaft, mbH, Leipzig, 1888–1893. Volume 1, Volume 2, Volume 3.

The first comprehensive work on transformation groups, serving as the foundation for the modern theory of Lie groups.

==== Solvability of groups of odd order ====
- Walter Feit and John Thompson (1960)

Description: Gave a complete proof of the solvability of finite groups of odd order, establishing the long-standing Burnside conjecture that all finite non-abelian simple groups are of even order. Many of the original techniques used in this paper were used in the eventual classification of finite simple groups.

==== Homological Algebra ====
- Henri Cartan and Samuel Eilenberg (1956)

Provided the first fully worked out treatment of abstract homological algebra, unifying previously disparate presentations of homology and cohomology for associative algebras, Lie algebras, and groups into a single theory.

==== "Sur Quelques Points d'Algèbre Homologique" ====
- Alexander Grothendieck (1957)

Often referred to as the "Tôhoku paper", it revolutionized homological algebra by introducing abelian categories and providing a general framework for Cartan and Eilenberg's notion of derived functors.

== Algebraic geometry ==
=== Theorie der Abelschen Functionen ===
- Bernhard Riemann (1857)

Publication data: Journal für die Reine und Angewandte Mathematik

Developed the concept of Riemann surfaces and their topological properties beyond Riemann's 1851 thesis work, proved an index theorem for the genus (the original formulation of the Riemann–Hurwitz formula), proved the Riemann inequality for the dimension of the space of meromorphic functions with prescribed poles (the original formulation of the Riemann–Roch theorem), discussed birational transformations of a given curve and the dimension of the corresponding moduli space of inequivalent curves of a given genus, and solved more general inversion problems than those investigated by Abel and Jacobi. André Weil once wrote that this paper "is one of the greatest pieces of mathematics that has ever been written; there is not a single word in it that is not of consequence."

=== Faisceaux Algébriques Cohérents ===
- Jean-Pierre Serre

Publication data: Annals of Mathematics, 1955

FAC, as it is usually called, was foundational for the use of sheaves in algebraic geometry, extending beyond the case of complex manifolds. Serre introduced Čech cohomology of sheaves in this paper, and, despite some technical deficiencies, revolutionized formulations of algebraic geometry. For example, the long exact sequence in sheaf cohomology allows one to show that some surjective maps of sheaves induce surjective maps on sections; specifically, these are the maps whose kernel (as a sheaf) has a vanishing first cohomology group. The dimension of a vector space of sections of a coherent sheaf is finite, in projective geometry, and such dimensions include many discrete invariants of varieties, for example Hodge numbers. While Grothendieck's derived functor cohomology has replaced Čech cohomology for technical reasons, actual calculations, such as of the cohomology of projective space, are usually carried out by Čech techniques, and for this reason Serre's paper remains important.

=== Géométrie Algébrique et Géométrie Analytique ===
- Jean-Pierre Serre (1956)

In mathematics, algebraic geometry and analytic geometry are closely related subjects, where analytic geometry is the theory of complex manifolds and the more general analytic spaces defined locally by the vanishing of analytic functions of several complex variables. A (mathematical) theory of the relationship between the two was put in place during the early part of the 1950s, as part of the business of laying the foundations of algebraic geometry to include, for example, techniques from Hodge theory. (NB: While analytic geometry as use of Cartesian coordinates is also in a sense included in the scope of algebraic geometry, that is not the topic being discussed in this article.) The major paper consolidating the theory was Géometrie Algébrique et Géométrie Analytique by Serre, now usually referred to as GAGA. A GAGA-style result would now mean any theorem of comparison, allowing passage between a category of objects from algebraic geometry, and their morphisms, and a well-defined subcategory of analytic geometry objects and holomorphic mappings.

=== Le théorème de Riemann–Roch, d'après A. Grothendieck ===
- Armand Borel, Jean-Pierre Serre (1958)

Borel and Serre's exposition of Grothendieck's version of the Riemann–Roch theorem, published after Grothendieck made it clear that he was not interested in writing up his own result. Grothendieck reinterpreted both sides of the formula that Hirzebruch proved in 1953 in the framework of morphisms between varieties, resulting in a sweeping generalization. In his proof, Grothendieck broke new ground with his concept of Grothendieck groups, which led to the development of K-theory.

=== Éléments de géométrie algébrique ===
- Alexander Grothendieck (1960–1967)

Written with the assistance of Jean Dieudonné, this is Grothendieck's exposition of his reworking of the foundations of algebraic geometry. It has become the most important foundational work in modern algebraic geometry. The approach expounded in EGA, as these books are known, transformed the field and led to monumental advances.

=== Séminaire de géométrie algébrique ===
- Alexander Grothendieck et al.

These seminar notes on Grothendieck's reworking of the foundations of algebraic geometry report on work done at IHÉS starting in the 1960s. SGA 1 dates from the seminars of 1960–1961, and the last in the series, SGA 7, dates from 1967 to 1969. In contrast to EGA, which is intended to set foundations, SGA describes ongoing research as it unfolded in Grothendieck's seminar; as a result, it is quite difficult to read, since many of the more elementary and foundational results were relegated to EGA. One of the major results building on the results in SGA is Pierre Deligne's proof of the last of the open Weil conjectures in the early 1970s. Other authors who worked on one or several volumes of SGA include Michel Raynaud, Michael Artin, Jean-Pierre Serre, Jean-Louis Verdier, Pierre Deligne, and Nicholas Katz.

== Number theory ==
=== Brāhmasphuṭasiddhānta ===
- Brahmagupta (628)

Brahmagupta's Brāhmasphuṭasiddhānta is the first book that mentions zero as a number, hence Brahmagupta is considered the first to formulate the concept of zero. The current system of the four fundamental operations (addition, subtraction, multiplication and division) based on the Hindu-Arabic number system also first appeared in Brahmasphutasiddhanta. It was also one of the first texts to provide concrete ideas on positive and negative numbers.

=== De fractionibus continuis dissertatio ===
- Leonhard Euler (1744)

First presented in 1737, this paper provided the first then-comprehensive account of the properties of continued fractions. It also contains the first proof that the number e is irrational.

=== Recherches d'Arithmétique ===
- Joseph Louis Lagrange (1775)

Developed a general theory of binary quadratic forms to handle the general problem of when an integer is representable by the form $ax^2 + by^2 + cxy$. This included a reduction theory for binary quadratic forms, where he proved that every form is equivalent to a certain canonically chosen reduced form.

=== Disquisitiones Arithmeticae ===
- Carl Friedrich Gauss (1801)

The Disquisitiones Arithmeticae is a book on number theory written by German mathematician Carl Friedrich Gauss and first published in 1801 when Gauss was 24. In this book Gauss brings together results in number theory obtained by mathematicians such as Fermat, Euler, Lagrange and Legendre and adds many important new results of his own. Among his contributions was the first complete proof known of the Fundamental theorem of arithmetic, the first two published proofs of the law of quadratic reciprocity, a deep investigation of binary quadratic forms going beyond Lagrange's work in Recherches d'Arithmétique, a first appearance of Gauss sums, cyclotomy, and the theory of constructible polygons with a particular application to the constructibility of the regular 17-gon. Of note, in section V, article 303 of Disquisitiones, Gauss summarized his calculations of class numbers of imaginary quadratic number fields, and in fact found all imaginary quadratic number fields of class numbers 1, 2, and 3 (confirmed in 1986) as he had conjectured. In section VII, article 358, Gauss proved what can be interpreted as the first non-trivial case of the Riemann Hypothesis for curves over finite fields (the Hasse–Weil theorem).

=== "Beweis des Satzes, daß jede unbegrenzte arithmetische Progression, deren erstes Glied und Differenz ganze Zahlen ohne gemeinschaftlichen Factor sind, unendlich viele Primzahlen enthält" ===
- Peter Gustav Lejeune Dirichlet (1837)

Pioneering paper in analytic number theory, which introduced Dirichlet characters and their L-functions to establish Dirichlet's theorem on arithmetic progressions. In subsequent publications, Dirichlet used these tools to determine, among other things, the class number for quadratic forms.

=== "Über die Anzahl der Primzahlen unter einer gegebenen Grösse" ===
- Bernhard Riemann (1859)

"Über die Anzahl der Primzahlen unter einer gegebenen Grösse" (or "On the Number of Primes Less Than a Given Magnitude") is a seminal 8-page paper by Bernhard Riemann published in the November 1859 edition of the Monthly Reports of the Berlin Academy. Although it is the only paper he ever published on number theory, it contains ideas which influenced dozens of researchers during the late 19th century and up to the present day. The paper consists primarily of definitions, heuristic arguments, sketches of proofs, and the application of powerful analytic methods; all of these have become essential concepts and tools of modern analytic number theory. It also contains the famous Riemann hypothesis, which establishes bounds on the distribution of prime numbers.

=== Vorlesungen über Zahlentheorie ===
- Peter Gustav Lejeune Dirichlet and Richard Dedekind

Vorlesungen über Zahlentheorie (Lectures on Number Theory) is a textbook of number theory written by German mathematicians P. G. Lejeune Dirichlet and R. Dedekind, and published in 1863. The Vorlesungen can be seen as a watershed between the classical number theory of Fermat, Jacobi and Gauss, and the modern number theory of Dedekind, Riemann and Hilbert. Dirichlet does not explicitly recognise the concept of the group that is central to modern algebra, but many of his proofs show an implicit understanding of group theory.

=== Zahlbericht ===
- David Hilbert (1897)

Unified and made accessible many of the developments in algebraic number theory made during the nineteenth century. Although criticized by André Weil (who stated "more than half of his famous Zahlbericht is little more than an account of Kummer's number-theoretical work, with inessential improvements") and Emmy Noether, it was highly influential for many years following its publication.

=== Fourier Analysis in Number Fields and Hecke's Zeta-Functions ===
- John Tate (1950)

Generally referred to simply as Tate's Thesis, Tate's Princeton PhD thesis, under Emil Artin, is a reworking of Erich Hecke's theory of zeta- and L-functions in terms of Fourier analysis on the adeles. The introduction of these methods into number theory made it possible to formulate extensions of Hecke's results to more general L-functions such as those arising from automorphic forms.

=== "Automorphic Forms on GL(2)" ===
- Hervé Jacquet and Robert Langlands (1970)

This publication offers evidence towards Langlands' conjectures by reworking and expanding the classical theory of modular forms and their L-functions through the introduction of representation theory.

=== "La conjecture de Weil. I." ===
- Pierre Deligne (1974)

Proved the Riemann hypothesis for varieties over finite fields, settling the last of the open Weil conjectures.

=== "Endlichkeitssätze für abelsche Varietäten über Zahlkörpern" ===
- Gerd Faltings (1983)

Faltings proves a collection of important results in this paper, the most famous of which is the first proof of the Mordell conjecture (a conjecture dating back to 1922). Other theorems proved in this paper include an instance of the Tate conjecture (relating the homomorphisms between two abelian varieties over a number field to the homomorphisms between their Tate modules) and some finiteness results concerning abelian varieties over number fields with certain properties.

=== "Modular Elliptic Curves and Fermat's Last Theorem" ===
- Andrew Wiles (1995)

This article proceeds to prove a special case of the Shimura–Taniyama conjecture through the study of the deformation theory of Galois representations. This in turn implies the famed Fermat's Last Theorem. The proof's method of identification of a deformation ring with a Hecke algebra (now referred to as an R=T theorem) to prove modularity lifting theorems has been an influential development in algebraic number theory.

=== The geometry and cohomology of some simple Shimura varieties ===
- Michael Harris and Richard Taylor (2001)

Harris and Taylor provide the first proof of the local Langlands conjecture for GL(n). As part of the proof, this monograph also makes an in depth study of the geometry and cohomology of certain Shimura varieties at primes of bad reduction.

=== "Le lemme fondamental pour les algèbres de Lie" ===
- Ngô Bảo Châu (2008)

Ngô Bảo Châu proved a long-standing unsolved problem in the classical Langlands program, using methods from the Geometric Langlands program.

=== "Perfectoid space" ===
- Peter Scholze (2012)

Peter Scholze introduced Perfectoid space.

== Analysis ==
=== Yuktibhāṣā ===
- Jyeshtadeva (1501)

Written in India in 1530, and served as a summary of the Kerala School's achievements in infinite series, trigonometry and mathematical analysis, most of which were earlier discovered by the 14th century mathematician Madhava. Some of its important developments includes infinite series and Taylor series expansion of some trigonometry functions and π approximation.

=== Introductio in analysin infinitorum ===
- Leonhard Euler (1748)

The eminent historian of mathematics Carl Boyer once called Euler's Introductio in analysin infinitorum the greatest modern textbook in mathematics. Published in two volumes, this book more than any other work succeeded in establishing analysis as a major branch of mathematics, with a focus and approach distinct from that used in geometry and algebra. Notably, Euler identified functions rather than curves to be the central focus in his book. Logarithmic, exponential, trigonometric, and transcendental functions were covered, as were expansions into partial fractions, evaluations of ζ(2k) for k a positive integer between 1 and 13, infinite series and infinite product formulas, continued fractions, and partitions of integers. In this work, Euler proved that every rational number can be written as a finite continued fraction, that the continued fraction of an irrational number is infinite, and derived continued fraction expansions for e and $\textstyle\sqrt{e}$. This work also contains a statement of Euler's formula and a statement of the pentagonal number theorem, which he had discovered earlier and would publish a proof for in 1751.

=== Calculus ===
==== Nova methodus pro maximis et minimis, itemque tangentibus, quae nec fractas nec irrationales quantitates moratur, et singulare pro illi calculi genus ====
- Gottfried Leibniz (1684)

Leibniz's first publication on differential calculus, containing the now familiar notation for differentials as well as rules for computing the derivatives of powers, products and quotients.

==== Philosophiae Naturalis Principia Mathematica ====
- Isaac Newton (1687)

The Philosophiae Naturalis Principia Mathematica (Latin: "mathematical principles of natural philosophy", often Principia or Principia Mathematica for short) is a three-volume work by Isaac Newton published on 5 July 1687. Perhaps the most influential scientific book ever published, it contains the statement of Newton's laws of motion forming the foundation of classical mechanics as well as his law of universal gravitation, and derives Kepler's laws for the motion of the planets (which were first obtained empirically). Here was born the practice, now so standard we identify it with science, of explaining nature by postulating mathematical axioms and demonstrating that their conclusion are observable phenomena. In formulating his physical theories, Newton freely used his unpublished work on calculus. When he submitted Principia for publication, however, Newton chose to recast the majority of his proofs as geometric arguments.

==== Institutiones calculi differentialis cum eius usu in analysi finitorum ac doctrina serierum ====
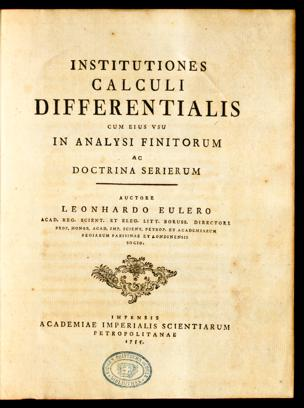
Institutiones calculi differentialis

- Leonhard Euler (1755)

Published in two books, Euler's textbook on differential calculus presented the subject in terms of the function concept, which he had introduced in his 1748 Introductio in analysin infinitorum. This work opens with a study of the calculus of finite differences and makes a thorough investigation of how differentiation behaves under substitutions. Also included is a systematic study of Bernoulli polynomials and the Bernoulli numbers (naming them as such), a demonstration of how the Bernoulli numbers are related to the coefficients in the Euler–Maclaurin formula and the values of ζ(2n), a further study of Euler's constant (including its connection to the gamma function), and an application of partial fractions to differentiation.

==== Über die Darstellbarkeit einer Function durch eine trigonometrische Reihe ====
- Bernhard Riemann (1867)

Written in 1853, Riemann's work on trigonometric series was published posthumously. In it, he extended Cauchy's definition of the integral to that of the Riemann integral, allowing some functions with dense subsets of discontinuities on an interval to be integrated (which he demonstrated by an example). He also stated the Riemann series theorem, proved the Riemann–Lebesgue lemma for the case of bounded Riemann integrable functions, and developed the Riemann localization principle.

==== Intégrale, longueur, aire ====
- Henri Lebesgue (1901)

Lebesgue's doctoral dissertation, summarizing and extending his research to date regarding his development of measure theory and the Lebesgue integral.

=== Complex analysis ===
==== Grundlagen für eine allgemeine Theorie der Functionen einer veränderlichen complexen Grösse ====
- Bernhard Riemann (1851)

Riemann's doctoral dissertation introduced the notion of a Riemann surface, conformal mapping, simple connectivity, the Riemann sphere, the Laurent series expansion for functions having poles and branch points, and the Riemann mapping theorem.

=== Functional analysis ===
==== Théorie des opérations linéaires ====
- Stefan Banach (1932; originally published 1931 in Polish under the title Teorja operacyj.)
- Banach, Stefan (1932). Théorie des Opérations Linéaires [Theory of Linear Operations] (PDF). Monografie Matematyczne (in French). Vol. 1. Warszawa: Subwencji Funduszu Kultury Narodowej. Zbl 0005.20901. Archived from the original (PDF) on 11 January 2014.

The first mathematical monograph on the subject of linear metric spaces, bringing the abstract study of functional analysis to the wider mathematical community. The book introduced the ideas of a normed space and the notion of a so-called B-space, a complete normed space. The B-spaces are now called Banach spaces and are one of the basic objects of study in all areas of modern mathematical analysis. Banach also gave proofs of versions of the open mapping theorem, closed graph theorem, and Hahn–Banach theorem.

==== Produits Tensoriels Topologiques et Espaces Nucléaires ====
- Grothendieck, Alexander (1955). "Produits Tensoriels Topologiques et Espaces Nucléaires" [Topological Tensor Products and Nuclear Spaces]. Memoirs of the American Mathematical Society Series (in French). 16. Providence: American Mathematical Society. MR 0075539. OCLC 9308061.

Grothendieck's thesis introduced the notion of a nuclear space, tensor products of locally convex topological vector spaces, and the start of Grothendieck's work on tensor products of Banach spaces.

Alexander Grothendieck also wrote a textbook on topological vector spaces:

- Grothendieck, Alexander (1973). Topological Vector Spaces. Translated by Chaljub, Orlando. New York: Gordon and Breach Science Publishers. ISBN 978-0-677-30020-7. OCLC 886098.

==== Sur certains espaces vectoriels topologiques ====
- Bourbaki, Nicolas (1987) [1981]. Topological Vector Spaces: Chapters 1–5. Éléments de mathématique. Translated by Eggleston, H.G.; Madan, S. Berlin New York: Springer-Verlag. ISBN 3-540-13627-4. OCLC 17499190.

=== Fourier analysis ===
==== Mémoire sur la propagation de la chaleur dans les corps solides ====
- Joseph Fourier (1807)

Introduced Fourier analysis, specifically Fourier series. Key contribution was to not simply use trigonometric series, but to model all functions by trigonometric series:

$\varphi(y)=a\cos\frac{\pi y}{2}+a'\cos 3\frac{\pi y}{2}+a''\cos5\frac{\pi y}{2}+\cdots.$

Multiplying both sides by $\cos(2i+1)\frac{\pi y}{2}$, and then integrating from $y=-1$ to $y=+1$ yields:

$a_i=\int_{-1}^1\varphi(y)\cos(2i+1)\frac{\pi y}{2}\,dy.$

When Fourier submitted his paper in 1807, the committee (which included Lagrange, Laplace, Malus and Legendre, among others) concluded: ...the manner in which the author arrives at these equations is not exempt of difficulties and [...] his analysis to integrate them still leaves something to be desired on the score of generality and even rigour. Making Fourier series rigorous, which in detail took over a century, led directly to a number of developments in analysis, notably the rigorous statement of the integral via the Dirichlet integral and later the Lebesgue integral.

==== Sur la convergence des séries trigonométriques qui servent à représenter une fonction arbitraire entre des limites données ====
- Peter Gustav Lejeune Dirichlet (1829, expanded German edition in 1837)

In his habilitation thesis on Fourier series, Riemann characterized this work of Dirichlet as "the first profound paper about the subject". This paper gave the first rigorous proof of the convergence of Fourier series under fairly general conditions (piecewise continuity and monotonicity) by considering partial sums, which Dirichlet transformed into a particular Dirichlet integral involving what is now called the Dirichlet kernel. This paper introduced the nowhere continuous Dirichlet function and an early version of the Riemann–Lebesgue lemma.

==== On convergence and growth of partial sums of Fourier series ====
- Lennart Carleson (1966)

Settled Lusin's conjecture that the Fourier expansion of any $L^2$ function converges almost everywhere.

== Geometry ==
=== Baudhayana Sulba Sutra ===
- Baudhayana

Believed to have been written around the 8th century BCE, this is one of the oldest mathematical texts. It laid the foundations of Indian mathematics and was influential in South Asia . Though this was primarily a geometrical text, it also contained some important algebraic developments, including the list of Pythagorean triples discovered algebraically, geometric solutions of linear equations, the use of quadratic equations and square root of 2.

=== Euclid's Elements ===
- Euclid

Publication data: c. 300 BC

Online version: Interactive Java version

This is often regarded as not only the most important work in geometry but one of the most important works in mathematics. It contains many important results in plane and solid geometry, algebra (books II and V), and number theory (book VII, VIII, and IX). More than any specific result in the publication, it seems that the major achievement of this publication is the promotion of an axiomatic approach as a means for proving results. Euclid's Elements has been referred to as the most successful and influential textbook ever written.

=== The Nine Chapters on the Mathematical Art ===
- Unknown author

This was a Chinese mathematics book, mostly geometric, composed during the Han dynasty, perhaps as early as 200 BC. It remained the most important textbook in China and East Asia for over a thousand years, similar to the position of Euclid's Elements in Europe. Among its contents: Linear problems solved using the principle known later in the West as the rule of false position. Problems with several unknowns, solved by a principle similar to Gaussian elimination. Problems involving the principle known in the West as the Pythagorean theorem.

=== The Conics ===
- Apollonius of Perga

The Conics was written by Apollonius of Perga, a Greek mathematician. His innovative methodology and terminology, especially in the field of conics, influenced many later scholars including Ptolemy, Francesco Maurolico, Isaac Newton, and René Descartes. It was Apollonius who gave the ellipse, the parabola, and the hyperbola the names by which we know them.

=== Surya Siddhanta ===
- Unknown (400 CE)

It describes the archeo-astronomy theories, principles and methods of the ancient Hindus. This siddhanta is supposed to be the knowledge that the Sun god gave to an Asura called Maya. It uses sine (jya), cosine (kojya or "perpendicular sine") and inverse sine (otkram jya) for the first time . Later Indian mathematicians such as Aryabhata made references to this text, while later Arabic and Latin translations were very influential in Europe and the Middle East.

=== Aryabhatiya ===
- Aryabhata (499 CE)

This was a highly influential text during the Golden Age of mathematics in India. The text was highly concise and therefore elaborated upon in commentaries by later mathematicians. It made significant contributions to geometry and astronomy, including introduction of sine/ cosine, determination of the approximate value of pi and accurate calculation of the earth's circumference.

=== La Géométrie ===
- René Descartes

La Géométrie was published in 1637 and written by René Descartes. The book was influential in developing the Cartesian coordinate system and specifically discussed the representation of points of a plane, via real numbers; and the representation of curves, via equations.

=== Grundlagen der Geometrie ===
- David Hilbert

Online version: English

Publication data: Hilbert, David (1899). Grundlagen der Geometrie. Teubner-Verlag Leipzig.

Hilbert's axiomatization of geometry, whose primary influence was in its pioneering approach to metamathematical questions including the use of models to prove axiom independence and the importance of establishing the consistency and completeness of an axiomatic system.

=== Regular Polytopes ===
- H.S.M. Coxeter

Regular Polytopes is a comprehensive survey of the geometry of regular polytopes, the generalisation of regular polygons and regular polyhedra to higher dimensions. Originating with an essay entitled Dimensional Analogy written in 1923, the first edition of the book took Coxeter 24 years to complete. Originally written in 1947, the book was updated and republished in 1963 and 1973.

=== Differential geometry ===
==== Recherches sur la courbure des surfaces ====
- Leonhard Euler (1760)

Publication data: Mémoires de l'académie des sciences de Berlin 16 (1760) pp. 119–143; published 1767. (Full text and an English translation available from the Dartmouth Euler archive.)

Established the theory of surfaces, and introduced the idea of principal curvatures, laying the foundation for subsequent developments in the differential geometry of surfaces.

==== Disquisitiones generales circa superficies curvas ====
- Carl Friedrich Gauss (1827)

Publication data: "Disquisitiones generales circa superficies curvas", Commentationes Societatis Regiae Scientiarum Gottingesis Recentiores Vol. VI (1827), pp. 99–146; "General Investigations of Curved Surfaces" (published 1965) Raven Press, New York, translated by A.M.Hiltebeitel and J.C.Morehead.

Groundbreaking work in differential geometry, introducing the notion of Gaussian curvature and Gauss's celebrated Theorema Egregium.

==== Über die Hypothesen, welche der Geometrie zu Grunde Liegen ====
- Bernhard Riemann (1854)

Publication data: "Über die Hypothesen, welche der Geometrie zu Grunde Liegen", Abhandlungen der Königlichen Gesellschaft der Wissenschaften zu Göttingen, Vol. 13, 1867. English translation

Riemann's famous Habiltationsvortrag, in which he introduced the notions of a manifold, Riemannian metric, and curvature tensor. Richard Dedekind reported on the reaction of the then 77 year old Gauss to Riemann's presentation, stating that it had "surpassed all his expectations" and that he spoke "with the greatest appreciation, and with an excitement rare for him, about the depth of the ideas presented by Riemann."

==== Leçons sur la théorie génerale des surfaces et les applications géométriques du calcul infinitésimal ====
- Gaston Darboux

Publication data: Darboux, Gaston (1890). Leçons sur la théorie génerale des surfaces. Vol. VI. Gauthier-Villars. Livre I (1887), Livre IV (1915), Livre VI (1894), Volume IV

Leçons sur la théorie génerale des surfaces et les applications géométriques du calcul infinitésimal (on the General Theory of Surfaces and the Geometric Applications of Infinitesimal Calculus). A treatise covering virtually every aspect of the 19th century differential geometry of surfaces.

== Topology ==
=== Analysis situs ===
- Henri Poincaré (1895, 1899–1905)

Description: Poincaré's Analysis Situs and his Compléments à l'Analysis Situs laid the general foundations for algebraic topology. In these papers, Poincaré introduced the notions of homology and the fundamental group, provided an early formulation of Poincaré duality, gave the Euler–Poincaré characteristic for chain complexes, and mentioned several important conjectures including the Poincaré conjecture, demonstrated by Grigori Perelman in 2003.

=== L'anneau d'homologie d'une représentation, Structure de l'anneau d'homologie d'une représentation ===
- Jean Leray (1946)

These two Comptes Rendus notes of Leray from 1946 introduced the novel concepts of sheafs, sheaf cohomology, and spectral sequences, which he had developed during his years of captivity as a prisoner of war. Leray's announcements and applications (published in other Comptes Rendus notes from 1946) drew immediate attention from other mathematicians. Subsequent clarification, development, and generalization by Henri Cartan, Jean-Louis Koszul, Armand Borel, Jean-Pierre Serre, and Leray himself allowed these concepts to be understood and applied to many other areas of mathematics. Dieudonné would later write that these notions created by Leray "undoubtedly rank at the same level in the history of mathematics as the methods invented by Poincaré and Brouwer".

=== Quelques propriétés globales des variétés differentiables ===
- René Thom (1954)

In this paper, Thom proved the Thom transversality theorem, introduced the notions of oriented and unoriented cobordism, and demonstrated that cobordism groups could be computed as the homotopy groups of certain Thom spaces. Thom completely characterized the unoriented cobordism ring and achieved strong results for several problems, including Steenrod's problem on the realization of cycles.

== Category theory ==
=== "General Theory of Natural Equivalences" ===
- Samuel Eilenberg and Saunders Mac Lane (1945)

The first paper on category theory. Mac Lane later wrote in Categories for the Working Mathematician that he and Eilenberg introduced categories so that they could introduce functors, and they introduced functors so that they could introduce natural equivalences. Prior to this paper, "natural" was used in an informal and imprecise way to designate constructions that could be made without making any choices. Afterwards, "natural" had a precise meaning which occurred in a wide variety of contexts and had powerful and important consequences.

=== Categories for the Working Mathematician ===
- Saunders Mac Lane (1971, second edition 1998)

Saunders Mac Lane, one of the founders of category theory, wrote this exposition to bring categories to the masses. Mac Lane brings to the fore the important concepts that make category theory useful, such as adjoint functors and universal properties.

=== Higher Topos Theory ===
- Jacob Lurie (2010)

This purpose of this book is twofold: to provide a general introduction to higher category theory (using the formalism of "quasicategories" or "weak Kan complexes"), and to apply this theory to the study of higher versions of Grothendieck topoi. A few applications to classical topology are included. (see arXiv.)

== Set theory ==
=== "Über eine Eigenschaft des Inbegriffes aller reellen algebraischen Zahlen" ===
- Georg Cantor (1874)

Online version: Online version

Contains the first published proof that the set of all real numbers is uncountable; also contains a proof that the set of algebraic numbers is countable. Both published proofs were supplied by Richard Dedekind in correspondence with Cantor, but left uncredited by Cantor. (See Georg Cantor's first set theory article.)

=== Grundzüge der Mengenlehre ===
- Felix Hausdorff

First published in 1914, this was the first comprehensive introduction to set theory. Besides the systematic treatment of known results in set theory, the book also contains chapters on measure theory and topology, which were then still considered parts of set theory. Here Hausdorff presents and develops highly original material which was later to become the basis for those areas.

=== "The consistency of the axiom of choice and of the generalized continuum-hypothesis with the axioms of set theory" ===
- Kurt Gödel (1938)

Gödel proves the results of the title. Also, in the process, introduces the class L of constructible sets, a major influence in the development of axiomatic set theory.

=== "The Independence of the Continuum Hypothesis" ===
- Paul J. Cohen (1963, 1964)

Cohen's breakthrough work proved the independence of the continuum hypothesis and axiom of choice with respect to Zermelo–Fraenkel set theory. In proving this Cohen introduced the concept of forcing which led to many other major results in axiomatic set theory.

== Logic ==
=== The Laws of Thought ===
- George Boole (1854)

Published in 1854, The Laws of Thought was the first book to provide a mathematical foundation for logic. Its aim was a complete re-expression and extension of Aristotle's logic in the language of mathematics. Boole's work founded the discipline of algebraic logic and would later be central for Claude Shannon in the development of digital logic.

=== Begriffsschrift ===
- Gottlob Frege (1879)

Published in 1879, the title Begriffsschrift is usually translated as concept writing or concept notation; the full title of the book identifies it as "a formula language, modelled on that of arithmetic, of pure thought". Frege's motivation for developing his formal logical system was similar to Leibniz's desire for a calculus ratiocinator. Frege defines a logical calculus to support his research in the foundations of mathematics. Begriffsschrift is both the name of the book and the calculus defined therein. It was arguably the most significant publication in logic since Aristotle.

=== Formulario mathematico ===
- Giuseppe Peano (1895)

First published in 1895, the Formulario mathematico was the first mathematical book written entirely in a formalized language. It contained a description of mathematical logic and many important theorems in other branches of mathematics. Many of the notations introduced in the book are now in common use.

=== Principia Mathematica ===
- Bertrand Russell and Alfred North Whitehead (1910–1913)

The Principia Mathematica is a three-volume work on the foundations of mathematics, written by Bertrand Russell and Alfred North Whitehead and published in 1910–1913. It is an attempt to derive all mathematical truths from a well-defined set of axioms and inference rules in symbolic logic. The questions remained whether a contradiction could be derived from the Principia's axioms, and whether there exists a mathematical statement which could neither be proven nor disproven in the system. These questions were settled, in a rather surprising way, by Gödel's incompleteness theorem in 1931.

=== "Über formal unentscheidbare Sätze der Principia Mathematica und verwandter Systeme, I" ===
(On Formally Undecidable Propositions of Principia Mathematica and Related Systems)

- Kurt Gödel (1931)

Online version: Online version

In mathematical logic, Gödel's incompleteness theorems are two celebrated theorems proved by Kurt Gödel in 1931. The first incompleteness theorem states:

For any formal system such that (1) it is $\omega$-consistent (omega-consistent), (2) it has a recursively definable set of axioms and rules of derivation, and (3) every recursive relation of natural numbers is definable in it, there exists a formula of the system such that, according to the intended interpretation of the system, it expresses a truth about natural numbers and yet it is not a theorem of the system.

=== Systems of Logic Based on Ordinals ===
- Alan Turing's PhD thesis (1938)

== Combinatorics ==
=== "On sets of integers containing no k elements in arithmetic progression" ===
- Endre Szemerédi (1975)

Settled a conjecture of Paul Erdős and Pál Turán (now known as Szemerédi's theorem) that if a sequence of natural numbers has positive upper density then it contains arbitrarily long arithmetic progressions. Szemerédi's solution has been described as a "masterpiece of combinatorics" and it introduced new ideas and tools to the field including a weak form of the Szemerédi regularity lemma.

=== Graph theory ===
==== Solutio problematis ad geometriam situs pertinentis ====
- Leonhard Euler (1741)
- Euler's original publication (in Latin)

Euler's solution of the Königsberg bridge problem in Solutio problematis ad geometriam situs pertinentis (The solution of a problem relating to the geometry of position) is considered to be the first theorem of graph theory.

==== "On the evolution of random graphs" ====
- Paul Erdős and Alfréd Rényi (1960)

Provides a detailed discussion of sparse random graphs, including distribution of components, occurrence of small subgraphs, and phase transitions.

==== "Network Flows and General Matchings" ====
- L. R. Ford, Jr. & D. R. Fulkerson
- Flows in Networks. Prentice-Hall, 1962.

Presents the Ford–Fulkerson algorithm for solving the maximum flow problem, along with many ideas on flow-based models.

== Probability theory and statistics ==
See list of important publications in statistics.

== Game theory ==
=== "Zur Theorie der Gesellschaftsspiele" ===
- John von Neumann (1928)

Went well beyond Émile Borel's initial investigations into strategic two-person game theory by proving the minimax theorem for two-person, zero-sum games.

=== Theory of Games and Economic Behavior ===
- Oskar Morgenstern, John von Neumann (1944)

This book led to the investigation of modern game theory as a prominent branch of mathematics. This work contained the method for finding optimal solutions for two-person zero-sum games.

=== "Equilibrium Points in N-person Games" ===
- Nash, John F. (January 1950). "Equilibrium Points in N-person Games". Proceedings of the National Academy of Sciences of the United States of America. 36 (1): 48–9. Bibcode:1950PNAS...36...48N. doi:10.1073/pnas.36.1.48. MR 0031701. PMC 1063129. PMID 16588946.

Nash equilibrium

=== On Numbers and Games ===
- John Horton Conway (1976)

The book is in two, {0,1|}, parts. The zeroth part is about numbers, the first part about games – both the values of games and also some real games that can be played such as Nim, Hackenbush, Col and Snort amongst the many described.

=== Winning Ways for your Mathematical Plays ===
- Elwyn Berlekamp, John Conway and Richard K. Guy (1982)

A compendium of information on mathematical games. It was first published in 1982 in two volumes, one focusing on Combinatorial game theory and surreal numbers, and the other concentrating on a number of specific games.

== Information theory ==
=== A Mathematical Theory of Communication ===
- Claude Shannon (1948)

An article, later expanded into a book, which developed the concepts of information entropy and redundancy, and introduced the term bit (which Shannon credited to John Tukey) as a unit of information.

== Fractals ==
=== How Long Is the Coast of Britain? Statistical Self-Similarity and Fractional Dimension ===
- Benoît Mandelbrot (1967)

A discussion of self-similar curves that have fractional dimensions between 1 and 2. These curves are examples of fractals, although Mandelbrot does not use this term in the paper, as he did not coin it until 1975. Shows Mandelbrot's early thinking on fractals, and is an example of the linking of mathematical objects with natural forms that was a theme of much of his later work.

== Numerical analysis ==
=== Optimization ===
==== Method of Fluxions ====
- Isaac Newton (1736)

Method of Fluxions was a book written by Isaac Newton. The book was completed in 1671, and published in 1736. Within this book, Newton describes a method (the Newton–Raphson method) for finding the real zeroes of a function.

==== Essai d'une nouvelle méthode pour déterminer les maxima et les minima des formules intégrales indéfinies ====
- Joseph Louis Lagrange (1761)

Major early work on the calculus of variations, building upon some of Lagrange's prior investigations as well as those of Euler. Contains investigations of minimal surface determination as well as the initial appearance of Lagrange multipliers.

==== "Математические методы организации и планирования производства" ====
- Leonid Kantorovich (1939) "[The Mathematical Method of Production Planning and Organization]" (in Russian).

Kantorovich wrote the first paper on production planning, which used Linear Programs as the model. He received the Nobel prize for this work in 1975.

==== "Decomposition Principle for Linear Programs" ====
- George Dantzig and P. Wolfe
- Operations Research 8:101–111, 1960.

Dantzig's is considered the father of linear programming in the western world. He independently invented the simplex algorithm. Dantzig and Wolfe worked on decomposition algorithms for large-scale linear programs in factory and production planning.

==== "How Good is the Simplex Algorithm?" ====
- Victor Klee and George J. Minty
- Klee, Victor; Minty, George J. (1972). "How good is the simplex algorithm?". In Shisha, Oved (ed.). Inequalities III (Proceedings of the Third Symposium on Inequalities held at the University of California, Los Angeles, Calif., September 1–9, 1969, dedicated to the memory of Theodore S. Motzkin). New York-London: Academic Press. pp. 159–175. MR 0332165.

Klee and Minty gave an example showing that the simplex algorithm can take exponentially many steps to solve a linear program.

==== "Полиномиальный алгоритм в линейном программировании" ====
- Khachiyan, Leonid Genrikhovich (1979). Полиномиальный алгоритм в линейном программировании [A polynomial algorithm for linear programming]. Doklady Akademii Nauk SSSR (in Russian). 244: 1093–1096..

Khachiyan's work on the ellipsoid method. This was the first polynomial time algorithm for linear programming.

== Early manuscripts ==
These are publications that are not necessarily relevant to a mathematician nowadays, but are nonetheless important publications in the history of mathematics.

=== Moscow Mathematical Papyrus ===
This is one of the earliest mathematical treatises that still survives today. The Papyrus contains 25 problems involving arithmetic, geometry, and algebra, each with a solution given. Written in Ancient Egypt at approximately 1850 BC.

=== Rhind Mathematical Papyrus ===
- Ahmes (scribe)

One of the oldest mathematical texts, dating to the Second Intermediate Period of ancient Egypt. It was copied by the scribe Ahmes (properly Ahmose) from an older Middle Kingdom papyrus. It laid the foundations of Egyptian mathematics and in turn, later influenced Greek and Hellenistic mathematics. Besides describing how to obtain an approximation of π only missing the mark by less than one per cent, Ahmes make use of a kind of an analogue of the cotangent.

=== Archimedes Palimpsest ===
- Archimedes of Syracuse

Although the only mathematical tools at its author's disposal were what we might now consider secondary-school geometry, he used those methods with rare brilliance, explicitly using infinitesimals to solve problems that would now be treated by integral calculus. Among those problems were that of the center of gravity of a solid hemisphere, that of the center of gravity of a frustum of a circular paraboloid, and that of the area of a region bounded by a parabola and one of its secant lines. For explicit details of the method used, see Archimedes' use of infinitesimals.

=== The Sand Reckoner ===
- Archimedes of Syracuse

Online version: Online version

The first known (European) system of number-naming that can be expanded beyond the needs of everyday life.

== Textbooks ==
=== Abstract Algebra ===
- David Dummit and Richard Foote

Dummit and Foote has become the modern dominant abstract algebra textbook following Jacobson's Basic Algebra.

=== Arithmetika Horvatzka ===
- Mihalj Šilobod Bolšić

Arithmetika Horvatzka (1758) was the first Croatian language arithmetic textbook, written in the vernacular Kajkavian dialect of Croatian language. It established a complete system of arithmetic terminology in Croatian, and vividly used examples from everyday life in Croatia to present mathematical operations. Although it was clear that Šilobod had made use of words that were in dictionaries, this was clearly insufficient for his purposes; and he made up some names by adapting Latin terminology to Kaikavian use. Full text of Arithmetika Horvatszka is available via archive.org.

=== Synopsis of Pure Mathematics ===
- G. S. Carr

Contains over 6000 theorems of mathematics, assembled by George Shoobridge Carr for the purpose of training his students for the Cambridge Mathematical Tripos exams. Studied extensively by Ramanujan. (first half here)

=== Éléments de mathématique ===
- Nicolas Bourbaki

One of the most influential books in French mathematical literature. It introduces some of the notations and definitions that are now usual (the symbol ∅ or the term bijective for example). Characterized by an extreme level of rigour, formalism and generality (up to the point of being highly criticized for that), its publication started in 1939 and is still unfinished today.

=== Arithmetick: or, The Grounde of Arts ===
- Robert Recorde

Written in 1542, it was the first really popular arithmetic book written in the English Language.

=== Cocker's Arithmetick ===
- Edward Cocker (authorship disputed)

Textbook of arithmetic published in 1678 by John Hawkins, who claimed to have edited manuscripts left by Edward Cocker, who had died in 1676. This influential mathematics textbook used to teach arithmetic in schools in the United Kingdom for over 150 years.

=== The Schoolmaster's Assistant, Being a Compendium of Arithmetic both Practical and Theoretical ===
- Thomas Dilworth

An early and popular English arithmetic textbook published in America in the 18th century. The book reached from the introductory topics to the advanced in five sections.

=== Geometry ===
- Andrei Kiselyov

Publication data: 1892

The most widely used and influential textbook in Russian mathematics. (See Kiselyov page.)

=== A Course of Pure Mathematics ===
- G. H. Hardy

A classic textbook in introductory mathematical analysis, written by G. H. Hardy. It was first published in 1908, and went through many editions. It was intended to help reform mathematics teaching in the UK, and more specifically in the University of Cambridge, and in schools preparing pupils to study mathematics at Cambridge. As such, it was aimed directly at "scholarship level" students – the top 10% to 20% by ability. The book contains a large number of difficult problems. The content covers introductory calculus and the theory of infinite series.

=== Moderne Algebra ===
- B. L. van der Waerden

The first introductory textbook (graduate level) expounding the abstract approach to algebra developed by Emil Artin and Emmy Noether. First published in German in 1931 by Springer Verlag. A later English translation was published in 1949 by Frederick Ungar Publishing Company.

=== Algebra ===
- Saunders Mac Lane and Garrett Birkhoff

A definitive introductory text for abstract algebra using a category theoretic approach. Both a rigorous introduction from first principles, and a reasonably comprehensive survey of the field.

=== Calculus, Vol. 1 ===
- Tom M. Apostol

=== Algebraic Geometry ===
- Robin Hartshorne

The first comprehensive introductory (graduate level) text in algebraic geometry that used the language of schemes and cohomology. Published in 1977, it lacks aspects of the scheme language which are nowadays considered central, like the functor of points.

=== Naive Set Theory ===
- Paul Halmos

An undergraduate introduction to not-very-naive set theory which has lasted for decades. It is still considered by many to be the best introduction to set theory for beginners. While the title states that it is naive, which is usually taken to mean without axioms, the book does introduce all the axioms of Zermelo–Fraenkel set theory and gives correct and rigorous definitions for basic objects. Where it differs from a "true" axiomatic set theory book is its character: There are no long-winded discussions of axiomatic minutiae, and there is next to nothing about topics like large cardinals. Instead it aims, and succeeds, in being intelligible to someone who has never thought about set theory before.

=== Cardinal and Ordinal Numbers ===
- Wacław Sierpiński

A canonical reference on transfinite numbers, first published in the early 1950s but based on the author's lectures on the subject over the preceding 40 years.

=== Set Theory: An Introduction to Independence Proofs ===
- Kenneth Kunen

A graduate textbook in axiomatic set theory, first published in 1980, provides an introduction to proofs of consistency and independence relative to ZFC. The text covers the foundations of axiomatic set theory, combinatorial set theory, basic methods for proving consistency, and forcing.

=== Topologie ===
- Pavel Sergeevich Alexandrov
- Heinz Hopf

First published round 1935, this text was a pioneering "reference" text book in topology, already incorporating many modern concepts from set-theoretic topology, homological algebra and homotopy theory.

=== General Topology ===
- John L. Kelley

First published in 1955, for many years the only introductory graduate level textbook in the US, teaching the basics of point set, as opposed to algebraic, topology. Prior to this the material, essential for advanced study in many fields, was only available in bits and pieces from texts on other topics or journal articles.

=== Topology from the Differentiable Viewpoint ===
- John Milnor

This short book introduces the main concepts of differential topology in Milnor's lucid and concise style. While the book does not cover very much, its topics are explained beautifully in a way that illuminates all their details.

=== Number Theory, An approach through history from Hammurapi to Legendre ===
- André Weil

Number Theory: An Approach Through History from Hammurapi to Legendre was first published in 1984. The book covers over three millennia of research on the development of number theory but the bulk of it is devoted to a detailed study and exposition of the work of Fermat, Euler, Lagrange, and Legendre.

=== An Introduction to the Theory of Numbers ===
- G. H. Hardy and E. M. Wright

An Introduction to the Theory of Numbers was first published in 1938, and is still in print, with the latest edition being the 6th (2008). It is likely that almost every serious student and researcher into number theory has consulted this book, and probably has it on their bookshelf. It was not intended to be a textbook, and is rather an introduction to a wide range of differing areas of number theory which would now almost certainly be covered in separate volumes. The writing style has long been regarded as exemplary, and the approach gives insight into a variety of areas without requiring much more than a good grounding in algebra, calculus and complex numbers.

=== Foundations of Differential Geometry ===
- Shoshichi Kobayashi and Katsumi Nomizu (1963; 1969)

=== Hodge Theory and Complex Algebraic Geometry II ===
- Claire Voisin

== Handbooks ==
=== Bronshtein and Semendyayev ===
- Ilya Nikolaevich Bronshtein and Konstantin Adolfovic Semendyayev

Bronshtein and Semendyayev is the informal name of a comprehensive handbook of fundamental working knowledge of mathematics and table of formulas originally compiled by the Russian mathematician Ilya Nikolaevich Bronshtein and engineer Konstantin Adolfovic Semendyayev. The work was first published in 1945 in Russia and soon became a "standard" and frequently used guide for scientists, engineers, and technical university students. It has been translated into German, English, and many other languages. The latest edition was published in 2015 by Springer.

=== CRC Standard Mathematical Tables ===
- Editors-in-chief: Charles D. Hodgman (14th edition and earlier); Samuel M. Selby (15th–23rd editions); William H. Beyer (24th–29th editions); Daniel Zwillinger (30th–33rd editions)

CRC Standard Mathematical Tables is a comprehensive one-volume handbook of fundamental working knowledge of mathematics and table of formulas. The handbook was originally published in 1928. The latest edition was published in 2018 by CRC Press, with Daniel Zwillinger as the editor-in-chief.

== Popular writings ==
=== Gödel, Escher, Bach ===
- Douglas Hofstadter

Gödel, Escher, Bach: an Eternal Golden Braid is a Pulitzer Prize-winning book, first published in 1979 by Basic Books. It is a book about how the creative achievements of logician Kurt Gödel, artist M. C. Escher and composer Johann Sebastian Bach interweave. As the author states: "I realized that to me, Gödel and Escher and Bach were only shadows cast in different directions by some central solid essence. I tried to reconstruct the central object, and came up with this book."

=== The World of Mathematics ===
- James R. Newman

The World of Mathematics was specially designed to make mathematics more accessible to the inexperienced. It comprises nontechnical essays on every aspect of the vast subject, including articles by and about scores of eminent mathematicians, as well as literary figures, economists, biologists, and many other eminent thinkers. Includes the work of Archimedes, Galileo, Descartes, Newton, Gregor Mendel, Edmund Halley, Jonathan Swift, John Maynard Keynes, Henri Poincaré, Lewis Carroll, George Boole, Bertrand Russell, Alfred North Whitehead, John von Neumann, and many others. In addition, an informative commentary by distinguished scholar James R. Newman precedes each essay or group of essays, explaining their relevance and context in the history and development of mathematics. Originally published in 1956, it does not include many of the exciting discoveries of the later years of the 20th century but it has no equal as a general historical survey of important topics and applications.

== See also ==
- List of mathematics journals
