= Orientation (vector space) =

Choice of reference for distinguishing an object and its mirror image

The left-handed orientation is shown on the left, and the right-handed on the right.

The orientation of a real vector space or simply orientation of a vector space is the arbitrary choice of which ordered bases are "positively" oriented and which are "negatively" oriented. In the three-dimensional Euclidean space, right-handed bases are typically declared to be positively oriented, but the choice is arbitrary. A vector space with an orientation selected is called an oriented vector space, while one not having an orientation selected is called unoriented.

In mathematics, orientability is a broader notion that, in two dimensions, allows one to say when a cycle goes around clockwise or counterclockwise, and in three dimensions when a figure is left-handed or right-handed. In linear algebra over the real numbers, the notion of orientation makes sense in arbitrary finite dimension, and is a kind of asymmetry that makes a reflection impossible to replicate by means of a simple displacement. Thus, in three dimensions, it is impossible to make the left hand of a human figure into the right hand of the figure by applying a displacement alone, but it is possible to do so by reflecting the figure in a mirror. As a result, in the three-dimensional Euclidean space, the two possible basis orientations are called right-handed and left-handed (or right-chiral and left-chiral).

== Definition ==
Let V be a finite-dimensional real vector space and let b_{1} and b_{2} be two ordered bases for V. It is a standard result in linear algebra that there exists a unique linear transformation A : V → V that takes b_{1} to b_{2}. The bases b_{1} and b_{2} are said to have the same orientation (or be consistently oriented) if A has positive determinant; otherwise they have opposite orientations. The property of having the same orientation defines an equivalence relation on the set of all ordered bases for V. If V is non-zero, there are precisely two equivalence classes determined by this relation. An orientation on V is an assignment of +1 to one equivalence class and −1 to the other.

Every ordered basis lives in one equivalence class or another. Thus any choice of a privileged ordered basis for V determines an orientation: the orientation class of the privileged basis is declared to be positive.

For example, the standard basis on R^{n} provides a standard orientation on R^{n} (in turn, the orientation of the standard basis depends on the orientation of the Cartesian coordinate system on which it is built). Any choice of a linear isomorphism between V and R^{n} will then provide an orientation on V.

The ordering of elements in a basis is crucial. Two bases with a different ordering will differ by some permutation. They will have the same/opposite orientations according to whether the signature of this permutation is ±1. This is because the determinant of a permutation matrix is equal to the signature of the associated permutation.

Similarly, let A be a nonsingular linear mapping of vector space R^{n} to R^{n}. This mapping is orientation-preserving if its determinant is positive. For instance, in R^{3} a rotation around the Z Cartesian axis by an angle α is orientation-preserving:
$$\mathbf {A}_1 = \begin{pmatrix}
\cos \alpha & -\sin \alpha & 0 \\
\sin \alpha & \cos \alpha & 0 \\
0 & 0 & 1
\end{pmatrix}$$
while a reflection by the XY Cartesian plane is not orientation-preserving:
$$\mathbf {A}_2 = \begin{pmatrix}
1 & 0 & 0 \\
0 & 1 & 0 \\
0 & 0 & -1
\end{pmatrix}$$

=== Zero-dimensional case ===
The concept of orientation degenerates in the zero-dimensional case. A zero-dimensional vector space has only a single point, the zero vector. Consequently, the only basis of a zero-dimensional vector space is the empty set $\emptyset$. Therefore, there is a single equivalence class of ordered bases, namely, the class $\{\emptyset\}$ whose sole member is the empty set. This means that an orientation of a zero-dimensional space is a function
$$\{\{\emptyset\}\} \to \{\pm 1\}.$$
It is therefore possible to orient a point in two different ways, positive and negative.

Because there is only a single ordered basis $\emptyset$, a zero-dimensional vector space is the same as a zero-dimensional vector space with ordered basis. Choosing $\{\emptyset\} \mapsto +1$ or $\{\emptyset\} \mapsto -1$ therefore chooses an orientation of every basis of every zero-dimensional vector space. If all zero-dimensional vector spaces are assigned this orientation, then, because all isomorphisms among zero-dimensional vector spaces preserve the ordered basis, they also preserve the orientation. This is unlike the case of higher-dimensional vector spaces where there is no way to choose an orientation so that it is preserved under all isomorphisms.

However, there are situations where it is desirable to give different orientations to different points. For example, consider the fundamental theorem of calculus as an instance of Stokes' theorem. A closed interval [a, b] is a one-dimensional manifold with boundary, and its boundary is the set {a, b}. In order to get the correct statement of the fundamental theorem of calculus, the point b should be oriented positively, while the point a should be oriented negatively.

=== On a line ===
The one-dimensional case deals with an oriented line (or directed line), which may be traversed in one of two directions. In real coordinate space, an oriented line is also known as an axis. There are two orientations to a line (forward and backward) just as there are two orientations to an oriented circle (clockwise and anti-clockwise). A semi-infinite oriented line is called a ray (sometimes also a half-axis or an oriented half-line). In the case of a line segment (a connected subset of a line), the two possible orientations result in directed line segments.

=== On a surface ===
An orientable surface sometimes has the selected orientation indicated by the orientation of a surface normal. An oriented plane can be defined by a pseudovector.

== Alternate viewpoints ==
=== Multilinear algebra ===
For any n-dimensional real vector space V we can form the kth-exterior power of V, denoted Λ^{k}V. This is a real vector space of dimension $\tbinom{n}{k}$. The vector space Λ^{n}V (called the top exterior power) therefore has dimension 1. That is, Λ^{n}V is just a real line. There is no a priori choice of which direction on this line is positive. An orientation is just such a choice. Any nonzero linear form ω on Λ^{n}V determines an orientation of V by declaring that x is in the positive direction when ω(x) > 0. To connect with the basis point of view we say that the positively-oriented bases are those on which ω evaluates to a positive number (since ω is an n-form we can evaluate it on an ordered set of n vectors, giving an element of R). The form ω is called an orientation form. If {e_{i}} is a privileged basis for V and {e_{i}^{∗}} is the dual basis, then the orientation form giving the standard orientation is e_{1}^{∗} ∧ e_{2}^{∗} ∧ … ∧ e_{n}^{∗}.

The connection of this with the determinant point of view is: the determinant of an endomorphism $T : V \to V$ can be interpreted as the induced action on the top exterior power.

=== Lie group theory ===
Let B be the set of all ordered bases for V. Then the general linear group GL(V) acts freely and transitively on B. (In fancy language, B is a GL(V)-torsor). This means that as a manifold, B is (noncanonically) homeomorphic to GL(V). Note that the group GL(V) is not connected, but rather has two connected components according to whether the determinant of the transformation is positive or negative (except for GL_{0}, which is the trivial group and thus has a single connected component; this corresponds to the canonical orientation on a zero-dimensional vector space). The identity component of GL(V) is denoted GL^{+}(V) and consists of those transformations with positive determinant. The action of GL^{+}(V) on B is not transitive: there are two orbits which correspond to the connected components of B. These orbits are precisely the equivalence classes referred to above. Since B does not have a distinguished element (i.e. a privileged basis) there is no natural choice of which component is positive. Contrast this with GL(V) which does have a privileged component: the component of the identity. A specific choice of homeomorphism between B and GL(V) is equivalent to a choice of a privileged basis and therefore determines an orientation.

More formally: $\pi_0(\operatorname{GL}(V)) = (\operatorname{GL}(V)/\operatorname{GL}^+(V) = \{\pm 1\}$, and the Stiefel manifold of n-frames in $V$ is a $\operatorname{GL}(V)$-torsor, so $V_n(V)/\operatorname{GL}^+(V)$ is a torsor over $\{\pm 1\}$, i.e., its 2 points, and a choice of one of them is an orientation.

=== Geometric algebra ===
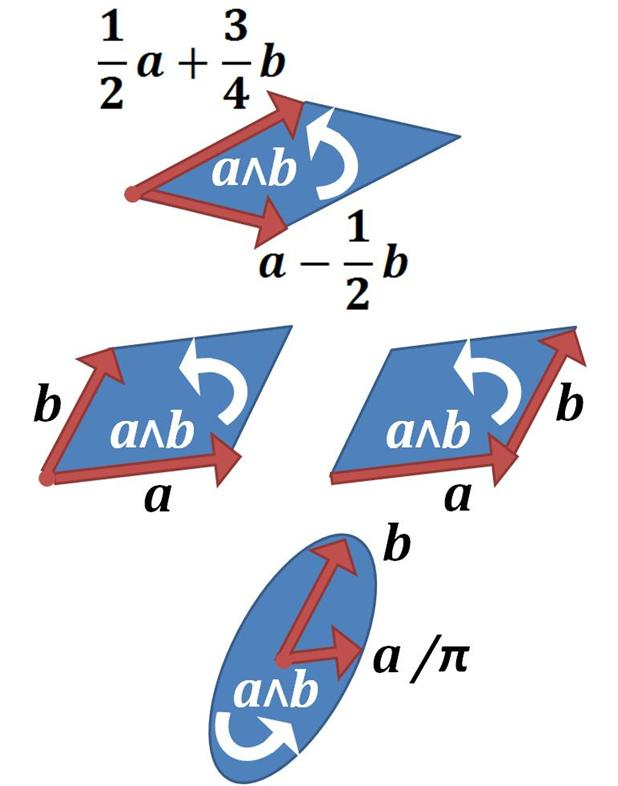
Parallel plane segments with the same attitude, magnitude and orientation, all corresponding to the same bivector a ∧ b.

The various objects of geometric algebra are charged with three attributes or features: attitude, orientation, and magnitude. For example, a vector has an attitude given by a straight line parallel to it, an orientation given by its sense (often indicated by an arrowhead) and a magnitude given by its length. Similarly, a bivector in three dimensions has an attitude given by the family of planes associated with it (possibly specified by the normal line common to these planes), an orientation (sometimes denoted by a curved arrow in the plane) indicating a choice of sense of traversal of its boundary (its circulation), and a magnitude given by the area of the parallelogram defined by its two vectors.

== Orientation on manifolds ==
The orientation of a volume may be determined by the orientation on its boundary, indicated by the circulating arrows.

Each point p on an n-dimensional differentiable manifold has a tangent space T_{p}M which is an n-dimensional real vector space. Each of these vector spaces can be assigned an orientation. Some orientations "vary smoothly" from point to point. Due to certain topological restrictions, this is not always possible. A manifold that admits a smooth choice of orientations for its tangent spaces is said to be orientable.

== See also ==
- Cartesian coordinate system – Coordinate system using perpendicular axes
- Chirality (mathematics) – Property of an object that is not congruent to its mirror image
- Even and odd permutations – Property in group theory
- Orientation of a vector bundle – Generalization of an orientation of a vector space
- Pseudovector – Physical quantity that changes sign with improper rotation
- Rotation formalisms in three dimensions – Ways to represent 3D rotations
- Right-hand rule – Mnemonic for 3D vectors orientations and rotations
- Sign convention – Agreed-upon meaning of a physical quantity being positive or negative
