= Orientation of a vector bundle =

Generalization of an orientation of a vector space

In mathematics, an orientation of a real vector bundle is a generalization of an orientation of a vector space; thus, given a real vector bundle π: E →B, an orientation of E means: for each fiber E_{x}, there is an orientation of the vector space E_{x} and one demands that each trivialization map (which is a bundle map)

$$\phi_U :  \pi^{-1}(U) \to U \times \mathbf{R}^n$$

is fiberwise orientation-preserving, where R^{n} is given the standard orientation. In more concise terms, this says that the structure group of the frame bundle of E, which is the real general linear group GL_{n}(R), can be reduced to the subgroup consisting of those with positive determinant.

If E is a real vector bundle of rank n, then a choice of metric on E amounts to a reduction of the structure group to the orthogonal group O(n). In that situation, an orientation of E amounts to a reduction from O(n) to the special orthogonal group SO(n).

A vector bundle together with an orientation is called an oriented bundle. A vector bundle that can be given an orientation is called an orientable vector bundle.

The basic invariant of an oriented bundle is the Euler class. The multiplication (that is, cup product) by the Euler class of an oriented bundle gives rise to a Gysin sequence.

== Examples ==
A complex vector bundle is oriented in a canonical way.

The notion of an orientation of a vector bundle generalizes an orientation of a differentiable manifold: an orientation of a differentiable manifold is an orientation of its tangent bundle. In particular, a differentiable manifold is orientable if and only if its tangent bundle is orientable as a vector bundle. (note: as a manifold, a tangent bundle is always orientable.)

== Operations ==
To give an orientation to a real vector bundle E of rank n is to give an orientation to the (real) determinant bundle $\operatorname{det} E = \wedge^n E$ of E. Similarly, to give an orientation to E is to give an orientation to the unit sphere bundle of E.

Just as a real vector bundle is classified by the real infinite Grassmannian, oriented bundles are classified by the infinite Grassmannian of oriented real vector spaces.

== Thom space ==
From the cohomological point of view, for any ring Λ, a Λ-orientation of a real vector bundle E of rank n means a choice (and existence) of a class

$$u \in H^n(T(E); \Lambda)$$

in the cohomology ring of the Thom space T(E) such that u generates $\tilde{H}^*(T(E); \Lambda)$ as a free $H^*(E; \Lambda)$-module globally and locally: i.e.,

$$H^*(E; \Lambda) \to \tilde{H}^*(T(E); \Lambda), x \mapsto  x \smile u$$

is an isomorphism (called the Thom isomorphism), where "tilde" means reduced cohomology, that restricts to each isomorphism

$$H^*(\pi^{-1}(U); \Lambda) \to \tilde{H}^*(T(E|_U); \Lambda)$$

induced by the trivialization $\pi^{-1}(U) \simeq U \times \mathbf{R}^n$. One can show, with some work, that the usual notion of an orientation coincides with a Z-orientation.

== See also ==
- The integration along the fiber
- Orientation bundle (or orientation sheaf) - this is used to formulate the Thom isomorphism for non-oriented bundles.
