= Cocker's Arithmetick =

Mathematics textbook by Edward Cocker

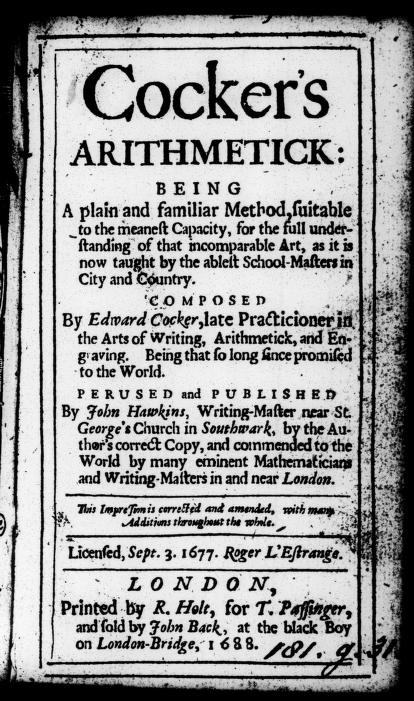
- Cover page of the first edition
- Author: Edward Cocker
- Language: English
- Subject: Mathematics
- Publisher: London
- Publication date: 1678
- Publication place: United Kingdom
- Media type: Print (hardcover)
- Pages: 334 pp (first edition)
- OCLC: 34162097

Cocker's Arithmetick is a grammar school mathematics textbook written by the English engraver and teacher Edward Cocker (1631–1676) and published posthumously by John Hawkins in 1678. Arithmetick along with companion volume, Decimal Arithmetick published in 1684, were used to teach mathematics in schools in the United Kingdom for more than 150 years.

== Disputed authorship ==
Some controversy exists over the authorship of the book. Augustus De Morgan claimed the work was written by Hawkins, who merely used Cocker's name to lend the authority of his reputation to the book. Ruth Wallis, in 1997, wrote an article in Annals of Science, claiming De Morgan's analysis was flawed and Cocker was the real author.

== Popularity and impact ==
The popularity of Arithmetick is unquestioned by its more than 130 editions, and that its place was woven in the fabric of the popular culture of the time is evidenced by its references in the phrase, "according to Cocker", meaning "absolutely correct" or "according to the rules". Such noted figures of history as Benjamin Franklin and Thomas Simpson are documented as having used the book. Over 100 years after its publication, Samuel Johnson carried a copy of Arithmetick on his tour of Scotland, and mentions it in his letters:

In the afternoon tea was made by a very decent girl in a printed linen; she engaged me so much, that I made her a present of Cocker's Arithmetick.

== Writing style ==
Though popular, like most texts of its time, Arithmetick's style is formal, stiff and difficult to follow as illustrated in its explanation of the "rule of three".

Again, observe, that of the three given numbers, those two that are of the same kind, one of them must be the first, and the other the third, and that which is of the same kind with the number sought, must be the second number in the rule of three; and that you may know which of the said numbers to make your first, and which your third, know this, that to one of those two numbers there is always affixed a demand, and that number upon which the demand lieth must always be reckoned the third number

As well as the rule of three, Arithmetick contains instructions on alligation and the rule of false position. Following the common practice of textbooks at the time, each rule is illustrated with numerous examples of commercial transactions involving the exchange of wheat, rye and other seeds; calculation of costs for the erection of houses and other structures; and the rotation of gears on a shaft. The text contains the earliest known use of the term lowest terms.
