= Steenrod problem =

Problem in mathematics

In mathematics, and particularly homology theory, Steenrod's Problem (named after mathematician Norman Steenrod) is a problem concerning the realisation of homology classes by singular manifolds.

== Formulation ==
Let $M$ be a closed, oriented manifold of dimension $n$, and let $[M] \in H_n(M)$ be its orientation class. Here $H_n(M)$ denotes the integral, $n$-dimensional homology group of $M$. Any continuous map $f\colon M\to X$ defines an induced homomorphism $f_*\colon H_n(M)\to H_n(X)$. A homology class of $H_n(X)$ is called realisable if it is of the form $f_*[M]$ for some manifold $M$ and map $f:M \to X$. The Steenrod problem is concerned with describing the realisable homology classes of $H_n(X)$.

== Results ==
All elements of $H_k(X)$ are realisable by smooth manifolds provided $k\le 6$. Moreover, any cycle can be realized by the mapping of a pseudo-manifold.

The assumption that M be orientable can be relaxed. In the case of non-orientable manifolds, every homology class of $H_n(X,\Z_2)$, where $\Z_2$ denotes the integers modulo 2, can be realized by a non-oriented manifold, $f\colon M^n\to X$.

== Conclusions ==
For smooth manifolds M the problem reduces to finding the form of the homomorphism $\Omega_n(X) \to H_n(X)$, where $\Omega_n(X)$ is the oriented bordism group of X. The connection between the bordism groups $\Omega_*$ and the Thom spaces MSO(k) clarified the Steenrod problem by reducing it to the study of the homomorphisms $H_*(\operatorname{MSO}(k)) \to H_*(X)$. In his landmark paper from 1954, René Thom produced an example of a non-realisable class, $[M] \in H_7(X)$, where M is the Eilenberg–MacLane space $K(\Z_3\oplus \Z_3,1)$.

== See also ==
- Singular homology
- Pontryagin-Thom construction
- Cobordism
