= Thom space =

Topological space associated to a vector bundle

In mathematics, the Thom space, Thom complex, or Pontryagin–Thom construction (named after René Thom and Lev Pontryagin) of algebraic topology and differential topology is a topological space associated to a vector bundle, over any paracompact space.

== Construction of the Thom space ==
One way to construct this space is as follows. Let

$$p\colon E \to B$$

be a rank n real vector bundle over the paracompact space B. Then for each point b in B, the fiber $E_b$ is an n-dimensional real vector space. We can form an n-sphere bundle $\operatorname{Sph}(E) \to B$ by taking the one-point compactification of each fiber and gluing them together to get the total space. Finally, from the total space $\operatorname{Sph}(E)$ we obtain the Thom space $T(E)$ as the quotient of $\operatorname{Sph}(E)$ by B; that is, by identifying all the new points to a single point $\infty$, which we take as the basepoint of $T(E)$. If B is compact, then $T(E)$ is the one-point compactification of E.

For example, if E is the trivial bundle $B\times \R^n$, then $\operatorname{Sph}(E)$ is $B\times S^n$ and, writing $B_+$ for B with a disjoint basepoint, $T(E)$ is the smash product of $B_+$ and $S^n$; that is, the n-th reduced suspension of $B_+$.

Alternatively, since B is paracompact, E can be given a Euclidean metric and then $T(E)$ can be defined as the quotient of the unit disk bundle of E by the unit $(n-1)$-sphere bundle of E.

== The Thom isomorphism ==
The significance of this construction begins with the following result, which belongs to the subject of cohomology of fiber bundles. (We have stated the result in terms of $\Z_2$ coefficients to avoid complications arising from orientability; see also Orientation of a vector bundle#Thom space.)

Let $p: E\to B$ be a real vector bundle of rank n. Then there is an isomorphism called a Thom isomorphism

$$\Phi : H^k(B; \Z_2) \to \widetilde{H}^{k+n}(T(E); \Z_2),$$

for all k greater than or equal to 0, where the right hand side is reduced cohomology.

This theorem was formulated and proved by René Thom in his famous 1952 thesis.

We can interpret the theorem as a global generalization of the suspension isomorphism on local trivializations, because the Thom space of a trivial bundle on B of rank k is isomorphic to the kth suspension of $B_+$, B with a disjoint point added (cf. #Construction of the Thom space.) This can be more easily seen in the formulation of the theorem that does not make reference to Thom space:

Thom isomorphism— Let $\Lambda$ be a ring and $p: E\to B$ be an oriented real vector bundle of rank n. Then there exists a class

$$u \in H^n(E, E \setminus B; \Lambda),$$

where B is embedded into E as a zero section, such that for any fiber F the restriction of u

$$u|_{(F, F \setminus 0)} \in H^n(F, F \setminus 0; \Lambda)$$

is the class induced by the orientation of F. Moreover,

$$\begin{cases} H^k(E; \Lambda) \to H^{k+n}(E, E \setminus B; \Lambda) \\ x \longmapsto x \smile u \end{cases}$$

is an isomorphism.

In concise terms, the last part of the theorem says that u freely generates $H^*(E, E \setminus B; \Lambda)$ as a right $H^*(E; \Lambda)$-module. The class u is usually called the Thom class of E. Since the pullback $p^*: H^*(B; \Lambda) \to H^*(E; \Lambda)$ is a ring isomorphism, $\Phi$ is given by the equation:

$$\Phi(b) = p^*(b) \smile u.$$

In particular, the Thom isomorphism sends the identity element of $H^*(B)$ to u. Note: for this formula to make sense, u is treated as an element of (we drop the ring $\Lambda$)

$\tilde{H}^n(T(E)) = H^n(\operatorname{Sph}(E), B) \simeq H^n(E, E \setminus B).$

The standard reference for the Thom isomorphism is the book by Bott and Tu.

== Significance of Thom's work ==
In his 1952 paper, Thom showed that the Thom class, the Stiefel–Whitney classes, and the Steenrod operations were all related. He used these ideas to prove in the 1954 paper Quelques propriétés globales des variétés differentiables that the cobordism groups could be computed as the homotopy groups of certain Thom spaces MG(n). The proof depends on and is intimately related to the transversality properties of smooth manifolds—see Thom transversality theorem. By reversing this construction, John Milnor and Sergei Novikov (among many others) were able to answer questions about the existence and uniqueness of high-dimensional manifolds: this is now known as surgery theory. In addition, the spaces MG(n) fit together to form spectra MG now known as Thom spectra, and the cobordism groups are in fact stable. Thom's construction thus also unifies differential topology and stable homotopy theory, and is in particular integral to our knowledge of the stable homotopy groups of spheres.

If the Steenrod operations are available, we can use them and the isomorphism of the theorem to construct the Stiefel–Whitney classes. Recall that the Steenrod operations (mod 2) are natural transformations

$$Sq^i : H^m(-; \Z_2) \to H^{m+i}(-; \Z_2),$$

defined for all nonnegative integers m. If $i=m$, then $Sq^i$ coincides with the cup square. We can define the ith Stiefel–Whitney class $w_i(p)$ of the vector bundle $p: E\to B$ by:

$$w_i(p) = \Phi^{-1}(Sq^i(\Phi(1))) = \Phi^{-1}(Sq^i(u)).$$

== Consequences for differentiable manifolds ==
If we take the bundle in the above to be the tangent bundle of a smooth manifold, the conclusion of the above is called the Wu formula, and has the following strong consequence: since the Steenrod operations are invariant under homotopy equivalence, we conclude that the Stiefel–Whitney classes of a manifold are as well. This is an extraordinary result that does not generalize to other characteristic classes. There exists a similar famous and difficult result establishing topological invariance for rational Pontryagin classes, due to Sergei Novikov.

== Thom spectrum ==
=== Real cobordism ===
There are two ways to think about bordism: one as considering two $n$-manifolds $M,M'$ are cobordant if there is an $(n+1)$-manifold with boundary $W$ such that

$$\partial W = M \coprod M'$$

Another technique to encode this kind of information is to take an embedding $M \hookrightarrow \R^{N + n}$ and considering the normal bundle

$$\nu: N_{\R^{N+n}/M} \to M$$

The embedded manifold together with the isomorphism class of the normal bundle actually encodes the same information as the cobordism class $[M]$. This can be shown by using a cobordism $W$ and finding an embedding to some $\R^{N_W + n}\times [0,1]$ which gives a homotopy class of maps to the Thom space $MO(n)$ defined below. Showing the isomorphism of

$$\pi_nMO \cong \Omega^O_n$$

requires a little more work.

=== Definition of Thom spectrum ===
By definition, the Thom spectrum is a sequence of Thom spaces

$$MO(n) = T(\gamma^n)$$

where we wrote $\gamma^n\to BO(n)$ for the universal vector bundle of rank n. The sequence forms a spectrum. A theorem of Thom says that $\pi_*(MO)$ is the unoriented cobordism ring; the proof of this theorem relies crucially on Thom’s transversality theorem. The lack of transversality requires that alternative methods be found to compute cobordism rings of, say, topological manifolds from Thom spectra.

== See also ==
- Cobordism
- Cohomology operation
- Steenrod problem
- Hattori–Stong theorem
