= Cobordism ring =

In mathematics, the oriented cobordism ring is a ring where elements are oriented cobordism classes of manifolds, the multiplication is given by the Cartesian product of manifolds and the addition is given as the disjoint union of manifolds. The ring is graded by dimensions of manifolds and is denoted by

$$\Omega^{SO}_* = \oplus_0^\infty \Omega^{SO}_n$$

where $\Omega^{SO}_n$ consists of oriented cobordism classes of manifolds of dimension n. One can also define an unoriented cobordism ring, denoted by $\Omega^O_*$. If O is replaced by U, then one gets the complex cobordism ring, oriented or unoriented.

In general, one writes $\Omega^B_*$ for the cobordism ring of manifolds with structure B.

A theorem of Thom says:

$$\Omega^O_n = \pi_{n}(MO)$$

where MO is the Thom spectrum.
