= Jet group =

In mathematics, a jet group is a generalization of the general linear group which applies to Taylor polynomials instead of vectors at a point. A jet group is a group of jets that describes how a Taylor polynomial transforms under changes of coordinate systems (or, equivalently, diffeomorphisms).

== Overview ==
The k-th order jet group G^{n}_{k} consists of jets of smooth diffeomorphisms φ: R^{n} → R^{n} such that φ(0)=0.

The following is a more precise definition of the jet group.

Let k ≥ 2. The differential of a function f: R^{k} → R can be interpreted as a section of the cotangent bundle of R^{K} given by df: R^{k} → T*R^{k}. Similarly, derivatives of order up to m are sections of the jet bundle J^{m}(R^{k}) = R^{k} × W, where

$$W = \mathbf R \times (\mathbf R^*)^k \times S^2( (\mathbf R^*)^k) \times \cdots \times S^{m} ( (\mathbf R^*)^k).$$

Here R* is the dual vector space to R, and S^{i} denotes the i-th symmetric power. A smooth function f: R^{k} → R has a prolongation j^{m}f: R^{k} → J^{m}(R^{k}) defined at each point p ∈ R^{k} by placing the i-th partials of f at p in the S^{i}((R*)^{k}) component of W.

Consider a point $p=(x,x')\in J^m(\mathbf R^n)$. There is a unique polynomial f_{p} in k variables and of order m such that p is in the image of j^{m}f_{p}. That is, $j^k(f_p)(x)=x'$. The differential data x′ may be transferred to lie over another point y ∈ R^{n} as j^{m}f_{p}(y) , the partials of f_{p} over y.

Provide J^{m}(R^{n}) with a group structure by taking

$$(x,x') * (y, y') = (x+y, j^mf_p(y) + y')$$

With this group structure, J^{m}(R^{n}) is a Carnot group of class m + 1.

Because of the properties of jets under function composition, G^{n}_{k} is a Lie group. The jet group is a semidirect product of the general linear group and a connected, simply connected nilpotent Lie group. It is also in fact an algebraic group, since the composition involves only polynomial operations.
