= Jet (mathematics) =

Operation in differential geometry

In mathematics, the jet is an operation that takes a differentiable function f and produces a polynomial, the Taylor polynomial (truncated Taylor series) of f, at each point of its domain. Although this is the definition of a jet, the theory of jets regards these polynomials as being abstract polynomials rather than polynomial functions.

This article first explores the notion of a jet of a real valued function in one real variable, followed by a discussion of generalizations to several real variables. It then gives a rigorous construction of jets and jet spaces between Euclidean spaces. It concludes with a description of jets between manifolds, and how these jets can be constructed intrinsically. In this more general context, it summarizes some of the applications of jets to differential geometry and the theory of differential equations.

== Jets of functions between Euclidean spaces ==
Before giving a rigorous definition of a jet, it is useful to examine some special cases.

=== One-dimensional case ===
Suppose that $f: {\mathbb R}\rightarrow{\mathbb R}$ is a real-valued function having at least k + 1 derivatives in a neighborhood U of the point $x_0$. Then by Taylor's theorem,

$$f(x)=f(x_0)+f'(x_0)(x-x_0)+\cdots+\frac{f^{(k)}(x_0)}{k!}(x-x_0)^{k}+\frac{R_{k+1}(x)}{(k+1)!}(x-x_0)^{k+1}$$

where

$$|R_{k+1}(x)|\le\sup_{x\in U} |f^{(k+1)}(x)|.$$

Then the k-jet of f at the point $x_0$ is defined to be the polynomial

$$(J^k_{x_0}f)(z)
=\sum_{i=0}^k \frac{f^{(i)}(x_0)}{i!}z^i
=f(x_0)+f'(x_0)z+\cdots+\frac{f^{(k)}(x_0)}{k!}z^k.$$

Jets are normally regarded as abstract polynomials in the variable z, not as actual polynomial functions in that variable. In other words, z is an indeterminate variable allowing one to perform various algebraic operations among the jets. It is in fact the base-point $x_0$ from which jets derive their functional dependency. Thus, by varying the base-point, a jet yields a polynomial of order at most k at every point. This marks an important conceptual distinction between jets and truncated Taylor series: ordinarily a Taylor series is regarded as depending functionally on its variable, rather than its base-point. Jets, on the other hand, separate the algebraic properties of Taylor series from their functional properties. We shall deal with the reasons and applications of this separation later in the article.

=== Mappings from one Euclidean space to another ===
Suppose that $f:{\mathbb R}^n\rightarrow{\mathbb R}^m$ is a function from one Euclidean space to another having at least (k + 1) derivatives. In this case, Taylor's theorem asserts that

$$\begin{align}
f(x)=f(x_0)+ (Df(x_0))\cdot(x-x_0)+ {} & \frac{1}{2}(D^2f(x_0))\cdot (x-x_0)^{\otimes 2} + \cdots \\[4pt]
& \cdots +\frac{D^kf(x_0)}{k!}\cdot(x-x_0)^{\otimes k}+\frac{R_{k+1}(x)}{(k+1)!}\cdot(x-x_0)^{\otimes (k+1)}.
\end{align}$$

The k-jet of f is then defined to be the polynomial

$$(J^k_{x_0}f)(z)=f(x_0)+(Df(x_0))\cdot z+\frac{1}{2}(D^2f(x_0))\cdot z^{\otimes 2} + \cdots + \frac{D^kf(x_0)}{k!}\cdot z^{\otimes k}$$

in ${\mathbb R}[z]$, where $z=(z_1,\ldots,z_n)$.

=== Algebraic properties of jets ===
There are two basic algebraic structures jets can carry. The first is a product structure, although this ultimately turns out to be the least important. The second is the structure of the composition of jets.

If $f,g:{\mathbb R}^n\rightarrow {\mathbb R}$ are a pair of real-valued functions, then we can define the product of their jets via

$$J^k_{x_0}f\cdot J^k_{x_0}g=J^k_{x_0}(f\cdot g).$$

Here we have suppressed the indeterminate z, since it is understood that jets are formal polynomials. This product is just the product of ordinary polynomials in z, modulo $z^{k+1}$. In other words, it is multiplication in the ring ${\mathbb R}[z]/(z^{k+1})$, where $(z^{k+1})$ is the ideal generated by homogeneous polynomials of order ≥ k + 1.

We now move to the composition of jets. To avoid unnecessary technicalities, we consider jets of functions that map the origin to the origin. If $f:{\mathbb R}^m\rightarrow{\mathbb R}^\ell$ and $g:{\mathbb R}^n\rightarrow{\mathbb R}^m$ with f(0) = 0 and g(0) = 0, then $f\circ g:{\mathbb R}^n \rightarrow{\mathbb R}^\ell$. The composition of jets is defined by $J^k_0 f\circ J^k_0 g=J^k_0 (f\circ g).$ It is readily verified, using the chain rule, that this constitutes an associative noncommutative operation on the space of jets at the origin.

In fact, the composition of k-jets is nothing more than the composition of polynomials modulo the ideal of homogeneous polynomials of order ≥ k + 1.

Examples:

- In one dimension, let $f(x)=\log(1-x)$ and $g(x)=\sin\,x$. Then

$$(J^3_0f)(x)=-x-\frac{x^2}{2}-\frac{x^3}{3}$$

$$(J^3_0g)(x)=x-\frac{x^3}{6}$$

and

$$\begin{align}
& (J^3_0f)\circ (J^3_0g)=-\left(x-\frac{x^3}{6}\right)-\frac{1}{2}\left(x-\frac{x^3}{6}\right)^2-\frac{1}{3} \left(x-\frac{x^3}{6}\right)^3 \pmod{x^4} \\[4pt]
= {} & -x-\frac{x^2}{2}-\frac{x^3}{6}
\end{align}$$

== Jets at a point in Euclidean space: rigorous definitions ==
=== Analytic definition ===
The following definition uses ideas from mathematical analysis to define jets and jet spaces. It can be generalized to smooth functions between Banach spaces, analytic functions between real or complex domains, to p-adic analysis, and to other areas of analysis.

Let $C^\infty({\mathbb R}^n,{\mathbb R}^m)$ be the vector space of smooth functions $f:{\mathbb R}^n\rightarrow {\mathbb R}^m$. Let k be a non-negative integer, and let p be a point of ${\mathbb R}^n$. We define an equivalence relation $E_p^k$ on this space by declaring that two functions f and g are equivalent to order k if f and g have the same value at p, and all of their partial derivatives agree at p up to (and including) their k-th-order derivatives. In short,$f \sim g \,\!$ iff $f-g = 0$ to k-th order.

The k-th-order jet space of $C^\infty({\mathbb R}^n,{\mathbb R}^m)$ at p is defined to be the set of equivalence classes of $E^k_p$, and is denoted by $J^k_p({\mathbb R}^n,{\mathbb R}^m)$.

The k-th-order jet at p of a smooth function $f\in C^\infty({\mathbb R}^n,{\mathbb R}^m)$ is defined to be the equivalence class of f in $J^k_p({\mathbb R}^n,{\mathbb R}^m)$.

=== Algebro-geometric definition ===
The following definition uses ideas from algebraic geometry and commutative algebra to establish the notion of a jet and a jet space. Although this definition is not particularly suited for use in algebraic geometry per se, since it is cast in the smooth category, it can easily be tailored to such uses.

Let $C_p^\infty({\mathbb R}^n,{\mathbb R}^m)$ be the vector space of germs of smooth functions $f:{\mathbb R}^n\rightarrow {\mathbb R}^m$ at a point p in ${\mathbb R}^n$. Let ${\mathfrak m}_p$ be the ideal consisting of germs of functions that vanish at p. (This is the maximal ideal for the local ring $C_p^\infty({\mathbb R}^n,{\mathbb R}^m)$.) Then the ideal ${\mathfrak m}_p^{k+1}$ consists of all function germs that vanish to order k+1 at p. We may now define the jet space at p by

$$J^k_p({\mathbb R}^n,{\mathbb R}^m)=C_p^\infty({\mathbb R}^n,{\mathbb R}^m)/{\mathfrak m}_p^{k+1}$$

If $f:{\mathbb R}^n\rightarrow {\mathbb R}^m$ is a smooth function, we may define the k-jet of f at p as the element of $J^k_p({\mathbb R}^n,{\mathbb R}^m)$ by setting

$$J^k_pf=f \pmod {{\mathfrak m}_p^{k+1}}$$

This is a more general construction. For an $\mathbb{F}$-space $M$, let $\mathcal{F}_p$ be the stalk of the structure sheaf at $p$ and let ${\mathfrak m}_p$ be the maximal ideal of the local ring $\mathcal{F}_p$. The kth jet space at $p$ is defined to be the ring $J^k_p(M)=\mathcal{F}_p/{\mathfrak m}_p^{k+1}$(${\mathfrak m}_p^{k+1}$ is the product of ideals).

=== Taylor's theorem ===
Regardless of the definition, Taylor's theorem establishes a canonical isomorphism of vector spaces between $J^k_p({\mathbb R}^n,{\mathbb R}^m)$ and ${\mathbb R}^m[z_1, \dotsc, z_n]/(z_1, \dotsc, z_n)^{k+1}$. So in the Euclidean context, jets are typically identified with their polynomial representatives under this isomorphism.

=== Jet spaces from a point to a point ===
We have defined the space $J^k_p({\mathbb R}^n,{\mathbb R}^m)$ of jets at a point $p\in {\mathbb R}^n$. The subspace of this consisting of jets of functions f such that f(p) = q is denoted by

$$J^k_p({\mathbb R}^n,{\mathbb R}^m)_q=\left\{J^kf\in J^k_p({\mathbb R}^n,{\mathbb R}^m) \mid f(p) = q \right\}$$

== Jets of functions between two manifolds ==
If M and N are two smooth manifolds, how do we define the jet of a function $f:M\rightarrow N$? We could perhaps attempt to define such a jet by using local coordinates on M and N. The disadvantage of this is that jets cannot thus be defined in an invariant fashion. Jets do not transform as tensors. Instead, jets of functions between two manifolds belong to a jet bundle.

=== Jets of functions from the real line to a manifold ===
Suppose that M is a smooth manifold containing a point p. We shall define the jets of curves through p, by which we henceforth mean smooth functions $f:{\mathbb R}\rightarrow M$ such that f(0) = p. Define an equivalence relation $E_p^k$ as follows. Let f and g be a pair of curves through p. We will then say that f and g are equivalent to order k at p if there is some neighborhood U of p, such that, for every smooth function $\varphi : U \rightarrow {\mathbb R}$, $J^k_0 (\varphi\circ f)=J^k_0 (\varphi\circ g)$. Note that these jets are well-defined since the composite functions $\varphi\circ f$ and $\varphi\circ g$ are just mappings from the real line to itself. This equivalence relation is sometimes called that of k-th-order contact between curves at p.

We now define the k-jet of a curve f through p to be the equivalence class of f under $E^k_p$, denoted $J^k\! f\,$ or $J^k_0f$. The k-th-order jet space $J^k_0({\mathbb R},M)_p$ is then the set of k-jets at p.

As p varies over M, $J^k_0({\mathbb R},M)_p$ forms a fibre bundle over M: the k-th-order tangent bundle, often denoted in the literature by T^{k}M (although this notation occasionally can lead to confusion). In the case k=1, then the first-order tangent bundle is the usual tangent bundle: T^{1}M = TM.

To prove that T^{k}M is in fact a fibre bundle, it is instructive to examine the properties of $J^k_0({\mathbb R},M)_p$ in local coordinates. Let (x^{i})= (x^{1},...,x^{n}) be a local coordinate system for M in a neighborhood U of p. Abusing notation slightly, we may regard (x^{i}) as a local diffeomorphism $(x^i):M\rightarrow\R^n$.

Claim. Two curves f and g through p are equivalent modulo $E_p^k$ if and only if $J^k_0\left((x^i)\circ f\right)=J^k_0\left((x^i)\circ g\right)$.

Indeed, the only if part is clear, since each of the n functions x^{1},...,x^{n} is a smooth function from M to ${\mathbb R}$. So by the definition of the equivalence relation $E_p^k$, two equivalent curves must have $J^k_0(x^i\circ f)=J^k_0(x^i\circ g)$.

Conversely, suppose that $\varphi$ is a smooth real-valued function on M in a neighborhood of p. Since every smooth function has a local coordinate expression, we may express $\varphi$ as a function in the coordinates. Specifically, if q is a point of M near p, then

$$\varphi(q)=\psi(x^1(q),\dots,x^n(q))$$

for some smooth real-valued function ψ of n real variables. Hence, for two curves f and g through p, we have

$$\varphi\circ f=\psi(x^1\circ f,\dots,x^n\circ f)$$
$$\varphi\circ g=\psi(x^1\circ g,\dots,x^n\circ g)$$

The chain rule now establishes the if part of the claim. For instance, if f and g are functions of the real variable t , then

$$\left. \frac{d}{dt} \left( \varphi\circ f \right) (t) \right|_{t=0}= \sum_{i=1}^n\left.\frac{d}{dt}(x^i\circ f)(t)\right|_{t=0}\ (D_i\psi)\circ f(0)$$

which is equal to the same expression when evaluated against g instead of f, recalling that f(0)=g(0)=p and f and g are in k-th-order contact in the coordinate system (x^{i}).

Hence the ostensible fibre bundle T^{k}M admits a local trivialization in each coordinate neighborhood. At this point, in order to prove that this ostensible fibre bundle is in fact a fibre bundle, it suffices to establish that it has non-singular transition functions under a change of coordinates. Let $(y^i):M\rightarrow{\mathbb R}^n$ be a different coordinate system and let $\rho=(x^i)\circ (y^i)^{-1}:{\mathbb R}^n\rightarrow {\mathbb R}^n$ be the associated change of coordinates diffeomorphism of Euclidean space to itself. By means of an affine transformation of ${\mathbb R}^n$, we may assume without loss of generality that ρ(0)=0. With this assumption, it suffices to prove that $J^k_0\rho:J^k_0({\mathbb R}^n,{\mathbb R}^n)\rightarrow J^k_0({\mathbb R}^n,{\mathbb R}^n)$ is an invertible transformation under jet composition. (See also jet groups.) But since ρ is a diffeomorphism, $\rho^{-1}$ is a smooth mapping as well. Hence,

$$I=J^k_0I=J^k_0(\rho\circ\rho^{-1})=J^k_0(\rho)\circ J^k_0(\rho^{-1})$$

which proves that $J^k_0\rho$ is non-singular. Furthermore, it is smooth, although we do not prove that fact here.

Intuitively, this means that we can express the jet of a curve through p in terms of its Taylor series in local coordinates on M.

Examples in local coordinates:

- As indicated previously, the 1-jet of a curve through p is a tangent vector. A tangent vector at p is a first-order differential operator acting on smooth real-valued functions at p. In local coordinates, every tangent vector has the form

$$v=\sum_iv^i\frac{\partial}{\partial x^i}$$

Given such a tangent vector v, let f be the curve given in the x^{i} coordinate system by $x^i\circ f(t)=tv^i$. If φ is a smooth function in a neighborhood of p with φ(p) = 0, then

$$\varphi\circ f:{\mathbb R}\rightarrow {\mathbb R}$$

is a smooth real-valued function of one variable whose 1-jet is given by

$$J^1_0(\varphi\circ f)(t)=\sum_itv^i \frac{\partial \varphi}{\partial x^i}(p).$$

which proves that one can naturally identify tangent vectors at a point with the 1-jets of curves through that point.

- The space of 2-jets of curves through a point.

In a local coordinate system x^{i} centered at a point p, we can express the second-order Taylor polynomial of a curve f(t) through p by

$$J_0^2(x^i(f))(t)=t\frac{dx^i(f)}{dt}(0)+\frac{t^2}{2}\frac{d^2x^i(f)}{dt^2}(0).$$

So in the x coordinate system, the 2-jet of a curve through p is identified with a list of real numbers $(\dot{x}^i,\ddot{x}^i)$. As with the tangent vectors (1-jets of curves) at a point, 2-jets of curves obey a transformation law upon application of the coordinate transition functions.

Let (y^{i}) be another coordinate system. By the chain rule,

$$\begin{align}
\frac{d}{dt}y^i(f(t)) & = \sum_j\frac{\partial y^i}{\partial x^j}(f(t))\frac{d}{dt}x^j(f(t)) \\[5pt]
\frac{d^2}{dt^2}y^i(f(t)) & = \sum_{j,k}\frac{\partial^2 y^i}{\partial x^j \, \partial x^k}(f(t))\frac{d}{dt}x^j(f(t)) \frac{d}{dt}x^k(f(t))+\sum_j\frac{\partial y^i}{\partial x^j}(f(t))\frac{d^2}{dt^2}x^j(f(t))
\end{align}$$

Hence, the transformation law is given by evaluating these two expressions at t = 0.

$$\begin{align}
& \dot{y}^i=\sum_j\frac{\partial y^i}{\partial x^j}(0)\dot{x}^j \\[5pt]
& \ddot{y}^i=\sum_{j,k}\frac{\partial^2 y^i}{\partial x^j \, \partial x^k}(0)\dot{x}^j\dot{x}^k+\sum_j\frac{\partial y^i}{\partial x^j}(0)\ddot{x}^j.
\end{align}$$

Note that the transformation law for 2-jets is second-order in the coordinate transition functions.

=== Jets of functions from a manifold to a manifold ===
We are now prepared to define the jet of a function from a manifold to a manifold.

Suppose that M and N are two smooth manifolds. Let p be a point of M. Consider the space $C^\infty_p(M,N)$ consisting of smooth maps $f:M\rightarrow N$ defined in some neighborhood of p. We define an equivalence relation $E^k_p$ on $C^\infty_p(M,N)$ as follows. Two maps f and g are said to be equivalent if, for every curve γ through p (recall that by our conventions this is a mapping $\gamma:{\mathbb R}\rightarrow M$ such that $\gamma(0)=p$), we have $J^k_0(f\circ \gamma)=J^k_0(g\circ \gamma)$ on some neighborhood of 0.

The jet space $J^k_p(M,N)$ is then defined to be the set of equivalence classes of $C^\infty_p(M,N)$ modulo the equivalence relation $E^k_p$. Note that because the target space N need not possess any algebraic structure, $J^k_p(M,N)$ also need not have such a structure. This is, in fact, a sharp contrast with the case of Euclidean spaces.

If $f:M\rightarrow N$ is a smooth function defined near p, then we define the k-jet of f at p, $J^k_pf$, to be the equivalence class of f modulo $E^k_p$.

=== Multijets ===
John Mather introduced the notion of multijet. Loosely speaking, a multijet is a finite list of jets over different base-points. Mather proved the multijet transversality theorem, which he used in his study of stable mappings.

== Jets of sections ==
Suppose that E is a finite-dimensional smooth vector bundle over a manifold M, with projection $\pi:E\rightarrow M$. Then sections of E are smooth functions $s:M\rightarrow E$ such that $\pi\circ s$ is the identity automorphism of M. The jet of a section s over a neighborhood of a point p is just the jet of this smooth function from M to E at p.

The space of jets of sections at p is denoted by $J^k_p(M,E)$. Although this notation can lead to confusion with the more general jet spaces of functions between two manifolds, the context typically eliminates any such ambiguity.

Unlike jets of functions from a manifold to another manifold, the space of jets of sections at p carries the structure of a vector space inherited from the vector space structure on the sections themselves. As p varies over M, the jet spaces $J^k_p(M,E)$ form a vector bundle over M, the k-th-order jet bundle of E, denoted by J^{k}(E).

- Example: The first-order jet bundle of the tangent bundle.

We work in local coordinates at a point and use the Einstein notation. Consider a vector field

$$v=v^i(x)\partial/\partial x^i$$

in a neighborhood of p in M. The 1-jet of v is obtained by taking the first-order Taylor polynomial of the coefficients of the vector field:

$$J_0^1v^i(x)=v^i(0)+x^j\frac{\partial v^i}{\partial x^j}(0)=v^i+v^i_jx^j.$$

In the x coordinates, the 1-jet at a point can be identified with a list of real numbers $(v^i,v^i_j)$. In the same way that a tangent vector at a point can be identified with the list (v^{i}), subject to a certain transformation law under coordinate transitions, we have to know how the list $(v^i,v^i_j)$ is affected by a transition.

So consider the transformation law in passing to another coordinate system y^{i}. Let w^{k} be the coefficients of the vector field v in the y coordinates. Then in the y coordinates, the 1-jet of v is a new list of real numbers $(w^i,w^i_j)$. Since

$$v=w^k(y)\partial/\partial y^k=v^i(x)\partial/\partial x^i,$$

it follows that

$$w^k(y)=v^i(x)\frac{\partial y^k}{\partial x^i}(x).$$

So

$$w^k(0)+y^j\frac{\partial w^k}{\partial y^j}(0)=\left(v^i(0)+x^j\frac{\partial v^i}{\partial x^j}\right)\frac{\partial y^k}{\partial x^i}(x)$$

Expanding by a Taylor series, we have

$$w^k=\frac{\partial y^k}{\partial x^i}(0) v^i$$
$$w^k_j=v^i\frac{\partial^2 y^k}{\partial x^i \, \partial x^j}+v_j^i\frac{\partial y^k}{\partial x^i}.$$

Note that the transformation law is second-order in the coordinate transition functions.

== See also ==
- Jet group
- Jet bundle
- Lagrangian system
