= Transversality theorem =

Describes the transverse intersection properties of a smooth family of smooth maps

In differential topology, the transversality theorem, also known as the Thom transversality theorem after French mathematician René Thom, is a major result that describes the transverse intersection properties of a smooth family of smooth maps. It says that transversality is a generic property: any smooth map $f\colon X\rightarrow Y$, may be deformed by an arbitrarily small amount into a map that is transverse to a given submanifold $Z \subseteq Y$. Together with the Pontryagin–Thom construction, it is the technical heart of cobordism theory, and the starting point for surgery theory. The finite-dimensional version of the transversality theorem is also a very useful tool for establishing the genericity of a property which is dependent on a finite number of real parameters and which is expressible using a system of nonlinear equations. This can be extended to an infinite-dimensional parametrization using the infinite-dimensional version of the transversality theorem.

== Finite-dimensional version ==
=== Previous definitions ===
Let $f\colon X\rightarrow Y$ be a smooth map between smooth manifolds, and let $Z$ be a submanifold of $Y$. We say that $f$ is transverse to $Z$, denoted as $f \pitchfork Z$, if and only if for every $x\in f^{-1}\left(Z\right)$ we have that

$$\operatorname{im}\left( df_x \right) + T_{f\left(x\right)} Z = T_{f\left(x\right)} Y$$.

An important result about transversality states that if a smooth map $f$ is transverse to $Z$, then $f^{-1}\left(Z\right)$ is a regular submanifold of $X$.

If $X$ is a manifold with boundary, then we can define the restriction of the map $f$ to the boundary, as $\partial f\colon\partial X \rightarrow Y$. The map $\partial f$ is smooth, and it allows us to state an extension of the previous result: if both $f \pitchfork Z$ and $\partial f \pitchfork Z$, then $f^{-1}\left(Z\right)$ is a regular submanifold of $X$ with boundary, and

$$\partial f^{-1}\left( Z \right) = f^{-1}\left( Z \right) \cap \partial X$$.

=== Parametric transversality theorem ===
Consider the map $F\colon X\times S \rightarrow Y$ and define $f_s\left(x\right) = F\left(x,s\right)$. This generates a family of mappings $f_s\colon X\rightarrow Y$. We require that the family vary smoothly by assuming $S$ to be a (smooth) manifold and $F$ to be smooth.

The statement of the parametric transversality theorem is:

Suppose that $F\colon X \times S \rightarrow Y$ is a smooth map of manifolds, where only $X$ has boundary, and let $Z$ be any submanifold of $Y$ without boundary. If both $F$ and $\partial F$ are transverse to $Z$, then for almost every $s\in S$, both $f_s$ and $\partial f_s$ are transverse to $Z$.

=== More general transversality theorems ===
The parametric transversality theorem above is sufficient for many elementary applications (see the book by Guillemin and Pollack).

There are more powerful statements (collectively known as transversality theorems) that imply the parametric transversality theorem and are needed for more advanced applications.

Informally, the "transversality theorem" states that the set of mappings that are transverse to a given submanifold is a dense open (or, in some cases, only a dense Gδ subset of the set of mappings. To make such a statement precise, it is necessary to define the space of mappings under consideration, and what is the topology in it. There are several possibilities; see the book by Hirsch.

What is usually understood by Thom's transversality theorem is a more powerful statement about jet transversality. See the books by Hirsch and by Golubitsky and Guillemin. The original reference is Thom, Bol. Soc. Mat. Mexicana (2) 1 (1956), pp. 59–71.

John Mather proved in the 1970s an even more general result called the multijet transversality theorem. See the book by Golubitsky and Guillemin.

== Infinite-dimensional version ==
The infinite-dimensional version of the transversality theorem takes into account that the manifolds may be modeled in Banach spaces.

=== Formal statement ===
Suppose $F: X \times S \to Y$ is a $C^k$ map of $C^\infty$-Banach manifolds. Assume:

(i) $X, S$ and $Y$ are non-empty, metrizable $C^\infty$-Banach manifolds with chart spaces over a field $\mathbb{K}.$

(ii) The $C^k$-map $F:X \times S \to Y$ with $k\geq 1$ has $y$ as a regular value.

(iii) For each parameter $s\in S$, the map $f_s(x) = F(x,s)$ is a Fredholm map, where $\operatorname{ind} Df_s(x)<k$ for every $x\in f_{s}^{-1}(\{y\}).$

(iv) The convergence $s_n \to s$ on $S$ as $n \to \infty$ and $F(x_n,s_n) = y$ for all $n$ implies the existence of a convergent subsequence $x_n \to x$ as $n \to \infty$ with $x\in X.$

If (i)-(iv) hold, then there exists an open, dense subset $S_0 \subset S$ such that $y$ is a regular value of $f_s$ for each parameter $s\in S_0.$

Now, fix an element $s\in S_0.$ If there exists a number $n\geq 0$ with $\operatorname{ind} Df_s(x) = n$ for all solutions $x\in X$ of $f_s(x) = y$, then the solution set $f_s^{-1}(\{y\})$ consists of an $n$-dimensional $C^k$-Banach manifold or the solution set is empty.

Note that if $\operatorname{ind} Df_s(x) = 0$ for all the solutions of $f_s(x) = y,$ then there exists an open dense subset $S_0$ of $S$ such that there are at most finitely many solutions for each fixed parameter $s\in S_0.$ In addition, all these solutions are regular.

== Bibliography ==
- Arnold, Vladimir I. (1988). Geometrical Methods in the Theory of Ordinary Differential Equations. Springer. ISBN 0-387-96649-8.
- Golubitsky, Martin; Guillemin, Victor (1974). Stable Mappings and Their Singularities. Springer-Verlag. ISBN 0-387-90073-X.
- Guillemin, Victor; Pollack, Alan (1974). Differential Topology. Prentice-Hall. ISBN 0-13-212605-2.
- Hirsch, Morris W. (1976). Differential Topology. Springer. ISBN 0-387-90148-5.
- Thom, René (1954). "Quelques propriétés globales des variétés differentiables". Commentarii Mathematici Helvetici. 28 (1): 17–86. doi:10.1007/BF02566923.
- Thom, René (1956). "Un lemme sur les applications différentiables". Bol. Soc. Mat. Mexicana. 2 (1): 59–71.
- Zeidler, Eberhard (1997). Nonlinear Functional Analysis and Its Applications: Part 4: Applications to Mathematical Physics. Springer. ISBN 0-387-96499-1.
