= Synopsis of Pure Mathematics =

1886 book by G. S. Carr

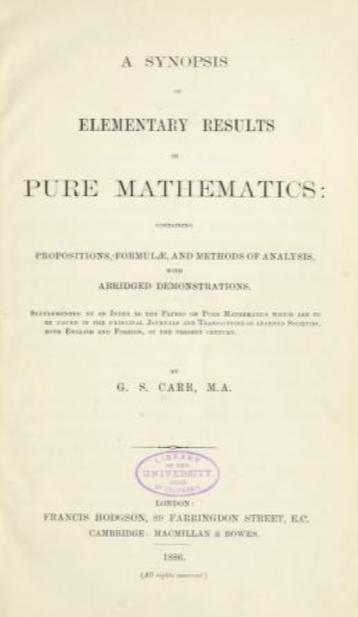
- Author: G. S. Carr
- Language: English
- Genre: Mathematics
- Publication date: 1886

Synopsis of Pure Mathematics is a book by G. S. Carr, written in 1886. The book attempted to summarize the state of most of the basic mathematics known at the time.

The book is noteworthy because it was a major source of information for the legendary and self-taught mathematician Srinivasa Ramanujan who managed to obtain a library loaned copy from a friend in 1903. Ramanujan reportedly studied the contents of the book in detail. The book is generally acknowledged as a key element in awakening the genius of Ramanujan.

Carr acknowledged the main sources of his book in its preface:

... In the Algebra, Theory of Equations, and Trigonometry sections, I am largely indebted to Todhunter's well-known treatises ...

In the section entitled Elementary Geometry, I have added to simpler propositions a selection of theorems from Townsend's Modern Geometry and Salmon's Conic Sections.

In Geometric Conics, the line of demonstration followed agrees, in the main, with that adopted in Drew's treatise on the subject. ...

The account of the C. G. S. system given in the preliminary section, has been compiled from a valuable contribution on the subject by Professor Everett, of Belfast, published by the Physical Society of London.

In addition to the authors already named, the following treatises have been consulted—Algebras, by Wood, Bourdon, and Lefebvre de Fourey; Snowball's Trigonometry; Salmon's Higher Algebra; the geometrical exercises in Pott's Euclid; and Geometrical Conics by Taylor, Jackson, and Renshaw.

== Bibliography ==
- Carr, George Shoobridge (1886), A synopsis of elementary results in pure mathematics containing propositions, formulae, and methods of analysis, with abridged demonstrations., Reprinted by Chelsea, 1970, London. Fr. Hodgson. Cambridge. Macmillan and Bowes, ISBN 978-0-8284-0239-2
