= Orientation sheaf =

In the mathematical field of algebraic topology, the orientation sheaf on a manifold X of dimension n is a locally constant sheaf o_{X} on X such that the stalk of o_{X} at a point x is the local homology group

$$o_{X, x} = \operatorname{H}_n(X, X - \{x\})$$

(in the integer coefficients or some other coefficients).

Let $\Omega^k_M$ be the sheaf of differential k-forms on a manifold M. If n is the dimension of M, then the sheaf

$$\mathcal{V}_M = \Omega^n_M \otimes \mathcal{o}_M$$

is called the sheaf of (smooth) densities on M. The point of this is that, while one can integrate a differential form only if the manifold is oriented, one can always integrate a density, regardless of orientation or orientability; there is the integration map:

$$\textstyle \int_M: \Gamma_c(M, \mathcal{V}_M) \to \mathbb{R}.$$

If M is oriented; i.e., the orientation sheaf of the tangent bundle of M is literally trivial, then the above reduces to the usual integration of a differential form.

== See also ==
- There is also a definition in terms of dualizing complex in Verdier duality; in particular, one can define a relative orientation sheaf using a relative dualizing complex.
