= G. S. Carr =

British mathematician

George Shoobridge Carr (1837–1914) was a British mathematician. He wrote Synopsis of Pure Mathematics (1886). This book, first published in England in 1880, was read and studied closely by mathematician Srinivasa Ramanujan when he was a teenager. Ramanujan had already produced many theorems by the age of 15.

Carr was a private coach for the Tripos mathematics examinations at the University of Cambridge, and the Synopsis was written as a study guide for those examinations.
