= Edward Cocker =

English engraver

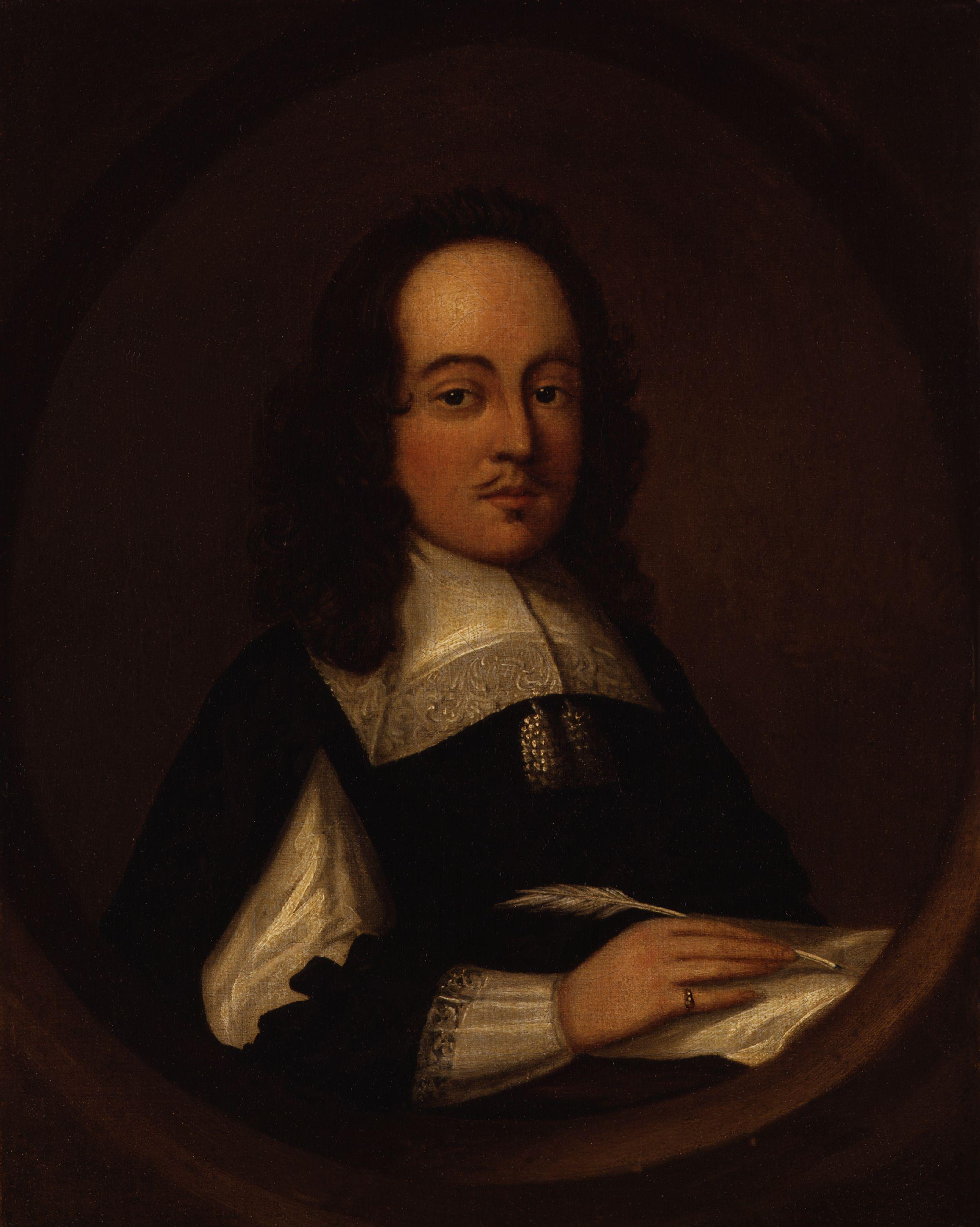
Portrait of Edward Cocker by Richard Gaywood, 1657

Edward Cocker (1631 – 22 August 1676) was an English engraver, who also taught calligraphy and arithmetic.

Cocker was the reputed author of the famous Arithmetick, the popularity of which has added a phrase ("according to Cocker") to the list of English proverbialisms. He is credited with the authorship and execution of some fourteen sets of copy slips, one of which, Daniel's Copy-Book, ingraven by Edward Cocker, Philomath (1664), is preserved in the British Museum. Samuel Pepys, in his Diary, makes very favourable mention of Cocker, who appears to have displayed great skill in his art.

Cocker's Arithmetick, the fifty-second edition of which appeared in 1748, and which passed through over 100 editions in all, was not published during the lifetime of its reputed author, the first impression being dated 1678. Augustus De Morgan in his Arithmetical Books (1847) argues that the work was a forgery of the editor and publisher, John Hawkins. Ruth Wallis, in 1997, wrote an article in Annals of Science, claiming De Morgan's analysis was flawed and Cocker was the real author.
