= Orientability =

Possibility of a consistent definition of "clockwise" in a mathematical space

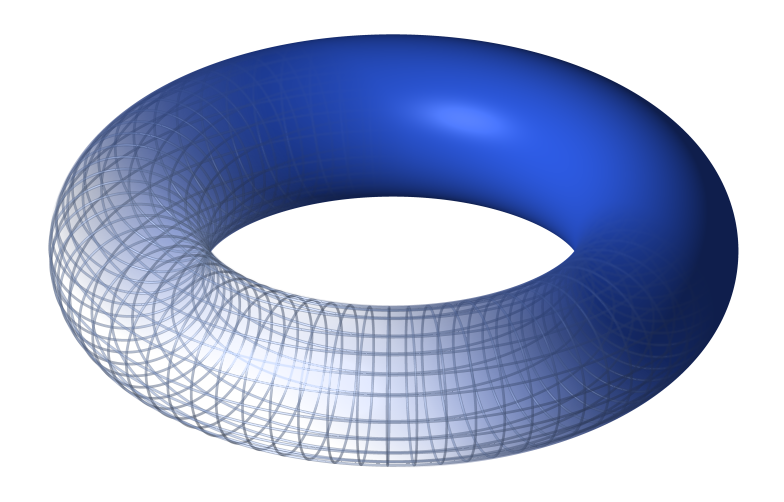
A torus is an orientable surface

The Möbius strip is a non-orientable surface. Note how the disk flips with every loop.

The Roman surface is non-orientable.

In mathematics, orientability is a property of some topological spaces such as real vector spaces, Euclidean spaces, surfaces, and more generally manifolds that allows a consistent definition of "clockwise" and "anticlockwise". It generalizes the concept of curve orientation, which for a plane simple closed curve is defined based on whether the curve interior is to the left or to the right of the curve. A space is orientable if such a consistent definition exists. In this case, there are two possible definitions, and a choice between them is an orientation of the space. Real vector spaces, Euclidean spaces, and spheres are orientable. A space is non-orientable if "clockwise" is changed into "counterclockwise" after running through some loops in it, and coming back to the starting point. This means that a geometric shape, such as, that moves continuously along such a loop is changed into its own mirror image. A Möbius strip is an example of a non-orientable space.

Various equivalent formulations of orientability can be given, depending on the desired application and level of generality. Formulations applicable to general topological manifolds often employ methods of homology theory, whereas for differentiable manifolds more structure is present, allowing a formulation in terms of differential forms. A generalization of the notion of orientability of a space is that of orientability of a family of spaces parameterized by some other space (a fiber bundle) for which an orientation must be selected in each of the spaces which varies continuously with respect to changes in the parameter values.

== Orientable surfaces ==
In this animation, a simple analogy is made using a gear that rotates according to the right-hand rule on a surface's normal vector. The orientation of the curves given by the boundaries is given by the direction in which the dots move as they are pushed by the moving gear. On a non-orientable surface, such as the Möbius strip, the boundary would have to move in both directions at once, which is not possible.

A surface $S$ in the Euclidean space $\mathbb{R}^3$ is orientable if a chiral two-dimensional figure (for example,) cannot be moved around the surface and back to where it started so that it looks like its own mirror image. Otherwise the surface is non-orientable. An abstract surface (i.e., a two-dimensional manifold) is orientable if a consistent concept of clockwise rotation can be defined on the surface in a continuous manner. That is to say that a loop going around one way on the surface can never be continuously deformed (without overlapping itself) to a loop going around the opposite way. This turns out to be equivalent to the question of whether the surface contains no subset that is homeomorphic to the Möbius strip. Thus, for surfaces, the Möbius strip may be considered the source of all non-orientability.

For an orientable surface, a consistent choice of "clockwise" (as opposed to counter-clockwise) is called an orientation, and the surface is called oriented. For surfaces embedded in Euclidean space, an orientation is specified by the choice of a continuously varying surface normal $\mathbf{n}$ at every point. If such a normal exists at all, then there are always two ways to select it: $\mathbf{n}$ or $-\mathbf{n}$. More generally, an orientable surface admits exactly two orientations, and the distinction between an oriented surface and an orientable surface is subtle and frequently blurred. An orientable surface is an abstract surface that admits an orientation, while an oriented surface is a surface that is abstractly orientable, and has the additional datum of a choice of one of the two possible orientations.

=== Examples ===
Most surfaces encountered in the physical world are orientable. Spheres, planes, and tori are orientable, for example. But Möbius strips, real projective planes, and Klein bottles are non-orientable. They, as visualized in $3$-dimensions, all have just one side. The real projective plane and Klein bottle cannot be embedded in $\mathbb{R}^3$, only immersed with nice intersections.

Note that locally an embedded surface always has two sides, so a near-sighted ant crawling on a one-sided surface would think there is an "other side". The essence of one-sidedness is that the ant can crawl from one side of the surface to the "other" without going through the surface or flipping over an edge, but simply by crawling far enough.

In general, the property of being orientable is not equivalent to being two-sided; however, this holds when the ambient space (such as $R^3$ above) is orientable. For example, a torus embedded in
$$K^2 \times S^1$$
can be one-sided, and a Klein bottle in the same space can be two-sided; here $K^2$ refers to the Klein bottle.

=== Orientation by triangulation ===
Any surface has a triangulation: a decomposition into triangles such that each edge on a triangle is glued to at most one other edge. Each triangle is oriented by choosing a direction around the perimeter of the triangle, associating a direction to each edge of the triangle. If this is done in such a way that, when glued together, neighboring edges are pointing in the opposite direction, then this determines an orientation of the surface. Such a choice is only possible if the surface is orientable, and in this case there are exactly two different orientations.

If the figure can be consistently positioned at all points of the surface without turning into its mirror image, then this will induce an orientation in the above sense on each of the triangles of the triangulation by selecting the direction of each of the triangles based on the order red-green-blue of colors of any of the figures in the interior of the triangle.

This approach generalizes to any $n$-manifold having a triangulation. However, some 4-manifolds do not have a triangulation, and in general for $n > 4$ some $n$-manifolds have triangulations that are inequivalent.

=== Orientability and homology ===
If $H_1(S)$ denotes the first homology group of a closed surface $S$, then $S$ is orientable if and only if $H_1(S)$ has a trivial torsion subgroup. More precisely, if $S$ is orientable then $H_1(S)$ is a free abelian group, and if not then $H_1(S) = F + \mathbb{Z} / 2 \mathbb{Z}$ where $F$ is free abelian, and the $\mathbb{Z} / 2 \mathbb{Z}$ factor is generated by the middle curve in a Möbius band embedded in $S$.

== Orientability of manifolds ==
Let M be a connected topological n-manifold. There are several possible definitions of what it means for M to be orientable. Some of these definitions require that M has extra structure, like being differentiable. Occasionally, n = 0 must be made into a special case. When more than one of these definitions applies to M, then M is orientable under one definition if and only if it is orientable under the others.

=== Orientability of differentiable manifolds ===
The most intuitive definitions require that $M$ be a differentiable manifold. This means that the transition functions in the atlas of $M$ are $C^1$-functions. Such a function admits a Jacobian determinant. When the Jacobian determinant is positive, the transition function is said to be orientation preserving. An oriented atlas on $M$ is an atlas for which all transition functions are orientation preserving. $M$ is orientable if it admits an oriented atlas. When $n > 0$, an orientation of $M$ is a maximal oriented atlas. (When $n = 0$, i.e. $M$ is a point, an orientation of $M$ is a function $M \to \{ \pm 1 \}$.)

Orientability and orientations can also be expressed in terms of the tangent bundle. The tangent bundle is a vector bundle, so it is a fiber bundle with structure group $\operatorname{GL}(n, \mathbb{R})$. That is, the transition functions of the manifold induce transition functions on the tangent bundle which are fiberwise linear transformations. If the structure group can be reduced to the group $\operatorname{GL}^+(n, \mathbb{R})$ of positive determinant matrices, or equivalently if there exists an atlas whose transition functions determine an orientation preserving linear transformation on each tangent space, then the manifold $M$ is orientable. Conversely, $M$ is orientable if and only if the structure group of the tangent bundle can be reduced in this way. Similar observations can be made for the frame bundle.

Another way to define orientations on a differentiable manifold is through volume forms. A volume form is a nowhere vanishing section $\omega$ of ${\bigwedge}^{\!n} T^* M$, the top exterior power of the cotangent bundle of $M$. For example, $\mathbb{R}^n$ has a standard volume form given by $dx^1 \wedge \cdots \wedge dx^n$. Given a volume form on $M$, the collection of all charts $U \to \mathbb{R}^n$ for which the standard volume form pulls back to a positive multiple of $\omega$ is an oriented atlas. The existence of a volume form is therefore equivalent to orientability of the manifold.

Volume forms and tangent vectors can be combined to give yet another description of orientability. If $X_1, \ldots, X_n$ is a basis of tangent vectors at a point $p$, then the basis is said to be right-handed if $\omega(X_1, \ldots, X_n) > 0$. A transition function is orientation preserving if and only if it sends right-handed bases to right-handed bases. The existence of a volume form implies a reduction of the structure group of the tangent bundle or the frame bundle to $\operatorname{GL}^+(n, \mathbb{R})$. As before, this implies the orientability of $M$. Conversely, if $M$ is orientable, then local volume forms can be patched together to create a global volume form, orientability being necessary to ensure that the global form is nowhere vanishing.

=== Homology and the orientability of general manifolds ===
At the heart of all the above definitions of orientability of a differentiable manifold is the notion of an orientation preserving transition function. This raises the question of what exactly such transition functions are preserving. They cannot be preserving an orientation of the manifold because an orientation of the manifold is an atlas, and it makes no sense to say that a transition function preserves or does not preserve an atlas of which it is a member.

This question can be resolved by defining local orientations. On a one-dimensional manifold, a local orientation around a point $p$ corresponds to a choice of left and right near that point. On a two-dimensional manifold, it corresponds to a choice of clockwise and counter-clockwise. These two situations share the common feature that they are described in terms of top-dimensional behavior near $p$ but not at $p$. For the general case, let $M$ be a topological $n$-manifold. A local orientation of $M$ around a point $p$ is a choice of generator of the group
$$H_n\left(M, M \setminus \{p\}; \mathbb{Z}\right).$$

To see the geometric significance of this group, choose a chart around $p$. In that chart there is a neighborhood of $p$ which is an open ball $B$ around the origin $O$. By the excision theorem, $H_n\left(M, M \setminus \{p\}; \mathbb{Z}\right)$ is isomorphic to $H_n\left(B, B \setminus \{O\}; \mathbb{Z}\right)$. The ball $B$ is contractible, so its homology groups vanish except in degree zero, and the space $B \setminus O$ is an $(n - 1)$-sphere, so its homology groups vanish except in degrees $n - 1$ and $0$. A computation with the long exact sequence in relative homology shows that the above homology group is isomorphic to $H_{n-1}\left(S^{n-1}; \mathbb{Z}\right) \cong \mathbb{Z}$. A choice of generator therefore corresponds to a decision of whether, in the given chart, a sphere around $p$ is positive or negative. A reflection of $\mathbb{R}^n$ through the origin acts by negation on $H_{n-1}\left(S^{n-1}; \mathbb{Z}\right)$, so the geometric significance of the choice of generator is that it distinguishes charts from their reflections.

On a topological manifold, a transition function is orientation preserving if, at each point $p$ in its domain, it fixes the generators of $H_n\left(M, M \setminus \{p\}; \mathbb{Z}\right)$. From here, the relevant definitions are the same as in the differentiable case. An oriented atlas is one for which all transition functions are orientation preserving, $M$ is orientable if it admits an oriented atlas, and when $n > 0$, an orientation of $M$ is a maximal oriented atlas.

Intuitively, an orientation of $M$ ought to define a unique local orientation of $M$ at each point. This is made precise by noting that any chart in the oriented atlas around $p$ can be used to determine a sphere around $p$, and this sphere determines a generator of $H_n\left(M, M \setminus \{p\}; \mathbb{Z}\right)$. Moreover, any other chart around $p$ is related to the first chart by an orientation preserving transition function, and this implies that the two charts yield the same generator, whence the generator is unique.

Purely homological definitions are also possible. Assuming that $M$ is closed and connected, $M$ is orientable if and only if the $n$th homology group $H_n(M; \mathbb{Z})$ is isomorphic to the integers $\mathbb{Z}$. An orientation of $M$ is a choice of generator $\alpha$ of this group. This generator determines an oriented atlas by fixing a generator of the infinite cyclic group $H_n(M ; \mathbb{Z})$ and taking the oriented charts to be those for which $\alpha$ pushes forward to the fixed generator. Conversely, an oriented atlas determines such a generator as compatible local orientations can be glued together to give a generator for the homology group $H_n(M ; \mathbb{Z})$.

=== Orientation and cohomology ===
A manifold $M$ is orientable if and only if the first Stiefel–Whitney class $w_1(M) \in H^1(M; \mathbb{Z} / 2 \mathbb{Z})$ vanishes. In particular, if the first cohomology group with $\mathbb{Z} / 2 \mathbb{Z}$ coefficients is zero, then the manifold is orientable. Moreover, if $M$ is orientable and $w_1$ vanishes, then $H^0(M; \mathbb{Z} / 2 \mathbb{Z})$ parametrizes the choices of orientations. This characterization of orientability extends to orientability of general vector bundles over $M$, not just the tangent bundle.

=== The orientation double cover ===
Around each point of $M$ there are two local orientations. Intuitively, there is a way to move from a local orientation at a point $p$ to a local orientation at a nearby point $p^\prime$: when the two points lie in the same coordinate chart $U \to \mathbb{R}^n$, that coordinate chart defines compatible local orientations at $p$ and $p^\prime$. The set of local orientations can therefore be given a topology, and this topology makes it into a manifold.

More precisely, let $O$ be the set of all local orientations of $M$. To topologize $O$ we will specify a subbase for its topology. Let $U$ be an open subset of $M$ chosen such that $H_n(M, M \setminus U; \mathbb{Z})$ is isomorphic to $\mathbb{Z}$. Assume that $\alpha$ is a generator of this group. For each $p$ in $U$, there is a pushforward function $H_n(M, M \setminus U; \mathbb{Z}) \to H_n\left(M, M \setminus \{p\}; \mathbb{Z}\right)$. The codomain of this group has two generators, and $\alpha$ maps to one of them. The topology on $O$ is defined so that
$$\{\text{Image of } \alpha \text{ in } H_n\left(M, M \setminus \{p\}; \mathbb{Z}\right) \colon p \in U\}$$
is open.

There is a canonical map $\pi : O \to M$ that sends a local orientation at $p$ to $p$. It is clear that every point of $M$ has precisely two preimages under $\pi$. In fact, $\pi$ is even a local homeomorphism, because the preimages of the open sets $U$ mentioned above are homeomorphic to the disjoint union of two copies of $U$. If $M$ is orientable, then $M$ itself is one of these open sets, so $O$ is the disjoint union of two copies of $M$. If $M$ is non-orientable, however, then $O$ is connected and orientable. The manifold $O$ is called the orientation double cover.

=== Manifolds with boundary ===
If $M$ is a manifold with boundary, then an orientation of $M$ is defined to be an orientation of its interior. Such an orientation induces an orientation of $\partial M$. Indeed, suppose that an orientation of $M$ is fixed. Let $U \to \mathbb{R}^n_+$ be a chart at a boundary point of $M$ which, when restricted to the interior of $M$, is in the chosen oriented atlas. The restriction of this chart to $\partial M$ is a chart of $\partial M$. Such charts form an oriented atlas for $\partial M$.

When $M$ is smooth, at each point $p$ of $\partial M$, the restriction of the tangent bundle of $M$ to $\partial M$ is isomorphic to $T_p \partial M \oplus \mathbb{R}$, where the factor of $\mathbb{R}$ is described by the inward pointing normal vector. The orientation of $T_p \partial M$ is defined by the condition that a basis of $T_p \partial M$ is positively oriented if and only if it, when combined with the inward pointing normal vector, defines a positively oriented basis of $T_p M$.

== Orientable double cover ==
Animation of the orientable double cover of the Möbius strip.

A closely related notion uses the idea of covering space. For a connected manifold $M$ take $M^*$, the set of pairs $(x,o)$ where $x$ is a point of $M$ and $o$ is an orientation at $x$; here we assume $M$ is either smooth so we can choose an orientation on the tangent space at a point or we use singular homology to define orientation. Then for every open, oriented subset of $M$ we consider the corresponding set of pairs and define that to be an open set of $M^*$. This gives $M^*$ a topology and the projection sending $(x,o)$ to $x$ is then a 2-to-1 covering map. This covering space is called the orientable double cover, as it is orientable. $M^*$ is connected if and only if $M$ is not orientable.

Another way to construct this cover is to divide the loops based at a basepoint into either orientation-preserving or orientation-reversing loops. The orientation preserving loops generate a subgroup of the fundamental group which is either the whole group or of index two. In the latter case (which means there is an orientation-reversing path), the subgroup corresponds to a connected double covering; this cover is orientable by construction. In the former case, one can simply take two copies of $M$, each of which corresponds to a different orientation.

== Orientation of vector bundles ==
A real vector bundle, which a priori has a $\operatorname{GL}(n)$ structure group, is called orientable when the structure group may be reduced to $\operatorname{GL}^{+}(n)$, the group of matrices with positive determinant. For the tangent bundle, this reduction is always possible if the underlying base manifold is orientable and in fact this provides a convenient way to define the orientability of a smooth real manifold: a smooth manifold is defined to be orientable if its tangent bundle is orientable (as a vector bundle). Note that as a manifold in its own right, the tangent bundle is always orientable, even over nonorientable manifolds.

== Related concepts ==
=== Lorentzian geometry ===
In Lorentzian geometry, there are two kinds of orientability: space orientability and time orientability. These play a role in the causal structure of spacetime. In the context of general relativity, a spacetime manifold is space orientable if, whenever two right-handed observers head off in rocket ships starting at the same spacetime point, and then meet again at another point, they remain right-handed with respect to one another. If a spacetime is time-orientable then the two observers will always agree on the direction of time at both points of their meeting. In fact, a spacetime is time-orientable if and only if any two observers can agree which of the two meetings preceded the other.

Formally, the pseudo-orthogonal group $\operatorname{O}(p,q)$ has a pair of characters: the space orientation character $\sigma_+$ and the time orientation character $\sigma_-$,
$$\sigma_{\pm} : \operatorname{O}(p, q)\to \{-1, +1\}.$$
Their product $\sigma = \sigma_+ \sigma_-$ is the determinant, which gives the orientation character. A space-orientation of a pseudo-Riemannian manifold is identified with a section of the associated bundle
$$\operatorname{O}(M) \times_{\sigma_+} \{-1,+1\}$$
where $\operatorname{O}(M)$ is the bundle of pseudo-orthogonal frames. Similarly, a time orientation is a section of the associated bundle
$$\operatorname{O}(M) \times_{\sigma_-} \{-1,+1\}.$$

== See also ==
- Curve orientation
- Orientation sheaf
