= Bibliotheca Teubneriana =

Series of classical texts

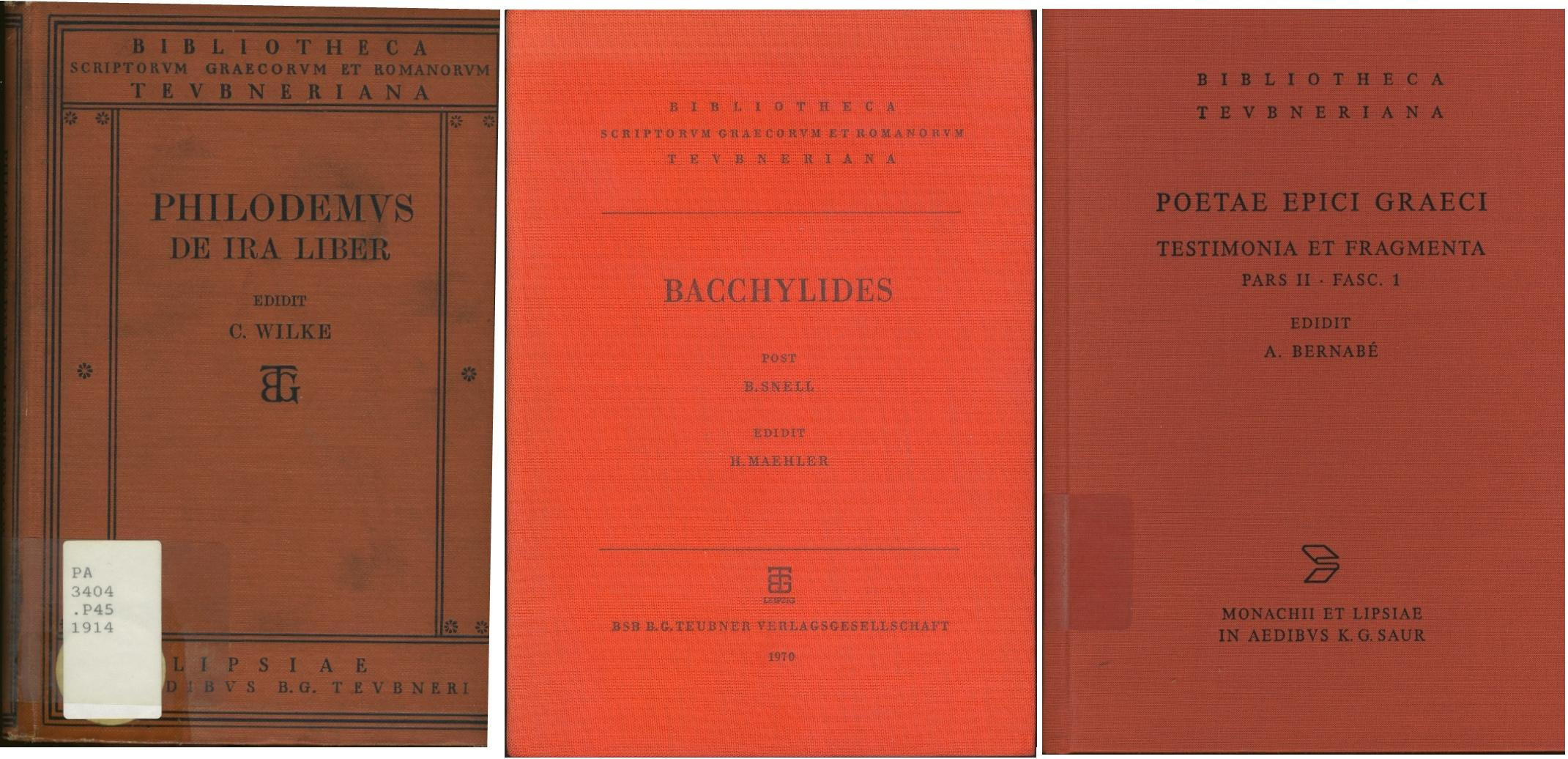
The covers of Bibliotheca Teubneriana Greek texts through the years: Philodemi De ira liber, ed. C. Wilke (1914); Bacchylidis carmina cum fragmentis, post B. Snell ed. H. Maehler (1970); Poetae epici Graeci, Pars II, Fasc. 1, ed. A. Bernabé (2004)

The Bibliotheca Teubneriana, or Bibliotheca Scriptorum Graecorum et Romanorum Teubneriana, also known as Teubner editions of Greek and Latin texts, comprises one of the most thorough modern collections published of ancient (and some medieval) Greco-Roman literature. The series consists of critical editions by leading scholars. They now always come with a full critical apparatus on each page, although during the nineteenth century there were editiones minores, published either without critical apparatuses or with abbreviated textual appendices, and editiones maiores, published with a full apparatus.

Teubneriana is an abbreviation used to denote mainly a single volume of the series (fully: editio Teubneriana), rarely the whole collection; correspondingly, Oxoniensis is used with reference to the Scriptorum Classicorum Bibliotheca Oxoniensis, mentioned above as Oxford Classical Texts.

The only comparable publishing ventures producing authoritative scholarly reference editions of numerous ancient authors, are the Oxford Classical Texts and the Collection Budé (whose volumes also include facing-page French translations with notes). The Loeb Classical Library, with facing-page English translations and notes, aims at a more general audience.

== History of the series ==
In 1811, Benedictus Gotthelf Teubner (1784–1856) refounded in his own name a printing operation he had directed since 1806, the Weinedelsche Buchdruckerei, giving rise to the Leipzig publishing house of B.G. Teubner (its imprint, in Latin, in aedibus B.G. Teubneri). The volumes of the Bibliotheca Teubneriana began to appear in 1849. Although today Teubner editions are relatively expensive, they were originally introduced to fill the need, then unmet, for low-priced but high-quality editions.

Prior to the introduction of the Teubner series, accurate editions of antique authors could only be purchased by libraries and rich private scholars because of their expense. Students and other individuals of modest means had to rely on editions which were affordable but also filled with errors. To satisfy the need for accurate and affordable editions Teubner introduced the Bibliotheca Teubneriana.

In the 19th century, Teubner offered both affordable editiones maiores (with a full critical apparatus) for scholars, and low-priced editiones minores (without critical apparatuses or with abbreviated textual appendices) for students. Eventually, editiones minores were dropped from the series and Teubner began to offer only scholarly reference editions of ancient authors.

During the period between the end of World War II and German reunification, the publishing house of B.G. Teubner split into two firms, Teubner KG (with Teubner Buch GmbH and Teubner Redaktions GmbH), later BSB B. G. Teubner Verlagsgesellschaft, in Leipzig in East Germany, and Verlag B. G. Teubner / BG Teubner GmbH in Stuttgart in West Germany. Both offered volumes in the Bibliotheca Teubneriana.

After the fall of the Berlin Wall and the reunification of Germany, B.G. Teubner was also reunited (B. G. Teubner Verlagsgesellschaft mbH) and subsequently consolidated its headquarters at Wiesbaden.

In late 1999, B.G. Teubner Verlag announced their intention to concentrate on scientific and technical publishing. All their Classical Studies titles, including the Biblotheca Teubneriana, were sold to K.G. Saur, a publisher based in Munich. Although new volumes began to appear with the imprint in aedibus K.G. Saur, the name of the series remained unchanged.

In 2006, the publishing firm of Walter de Gruyter acquired K.G. Saur and their entire publishing range, including the Bibliotheca Teubneriana. Since January 2007, the Bibliotheca Teubneriana is being exclusively published by Walter de Gruyter GmbH & Co. KG. As of 1 May 2007, the new North American distributor of titles from the Bibliotheca Teubneriana is Walter de Gruyter, Inc.

== Greek type in Teubner editions ==
While the typography of the Greek Teubners has been subject to innovations over the years, an overview of the whole series shows a great deal of consistency. The old-fashioned, cursive font used (with small variations) in most of the existing volumes is instantly recognized by classicists and strongly associated with Teubner.

=== Original "Teubner" font ===
Original Teubner Greek type, older (Iamblichus 1960) and newer (Pindarus 1964b).

This type was in regular use at least from the 1870s to the 1970s, for verse and prose texts. In older (e.g., nineteenth-century) Teubners, several old-fashioned features of the type (almost crabbed by the Porsonian standard more familiar in the English-speaking world) are still found which would later be smoothed away, for example, omega with bent-in ends, medial sigma that is not completely closed, and phi with a bent stem.

==== Upright variant ====
Upright variant: Iamblichus 1960.

Teubner used an upright type, designed to match the original cursive type, in some editions. In the example shown, the cursive type is still used in the critical apparatus. In other editions (for example, Aristotelis Athenaion politeia, ed. M. Chambers, Leipzig, 1986), this upright font is used throughout.

==== Digital descendants ====
Recent variants: italic (Euripides 1995) and upright (Aeschylus 1990; PEG 2004).

Beginning in the 1990s, the digital production of books has been marked by new digital fonts, sometimes based on Teubner's older traditions. In the 1990s, individual editions of Euripides' tragedies were digitally typeset in a font apparently based on the original Teubner cursive. There have also been recent innovations in upright type. One of these, which may be seen in Bernabé's edition of the Orphica, seems likely to be the current standard for new Teubners from K.G. Saur.

Teubner Greek type based on Griechische Antiqua (Philodemus 1914; Homerus 1962), with a digital descendant (Homerus 2000).

=== Griechische Antiqua ===
Some Teubner Greek editions made a bold typographic departure from the tradition outlined above. E. J. Kenney considered this twentieth-century experiment to be a refreshing break from the Porsonian norm, and emblematic of the best kind of modernist simplicity and directness:

More recently there has been a welcome and long overdue return to the older and purer models. The pleasing modification of M.E. Pinder's "Griechische Antiqua" used by Teubner in some of their editions represents a lost opportunity, having been regrettably abandoned in favour of the "dull and lumpish" fount (Victor Scholderer's words) that is still the uniform of the series.

Kenney referred to Bruno Snell's Bacchylides edition of 1934; closely comparable is the Philodemus example illustrated here.

A slightly less radical version of this font (notably without lunate sigma) was used in some later Teubner editions (and in non-Teubner publications such as Rahlfs' Septuaginta of 1935), and M. L. West's recent edition of the Iliad uses a digital font that seems closer to this type than to the main Teubner tradition.

Following the acquisition by Walter de Gruyter, the series replaced the traditional Teubner Greek Type with the modern sans-serif De Gruyter font.

== Selective list of titles ==
- Acta Alexandinorum: Musurillo, H. J., ed. (1961). Acta Alexandrinorum. Leipzig: B. G. Teubner.
- Aegritudo Perdicae: Zurli, L., ed. (1987). Aegritudo Perdicae. Leipzig: B. G. Teubner.
- Aelianus, Cl. (1974). Dilts, M. R. (ed.). Varia historia. Stuttgart – Leipzig: B. G. Teubner.
- Aelianus, Cl. (1994). Domingo-Forasté, D. (ed.). Epistulae et fragmenta. Stuttgart – Leipzig: B. G. Teubner. ISBN 3815410053.
- Aelianus, Cl. (2009). García Valdés, M.; Llera Fueyo, L. A.; Rodríguez-Noriega Guillén, L. (eds.). De natura animalium. BT 2006. Berlin – New York: Walter de Gruyter. ISBN 9783110220056.
- Aelianus (scholia): Meliadò, Cl., ed. (2017). Scholia in Claudii Aeliani libros de natura animalium. Berlin – New York: Walter de Gruyter.
- Aeschines (1895). Blass, F. (ed.). Orationes. Leipzig: B. G. Teubner.
- Aeschines (1908). Blass, F. (ed.). Orationes (2nd ed.). Leipzig: B. G. Teubner.
- Aeschines (1997). Dilts, M. R. (ed.). Orationes. Stuttgart – Leipzig: B. G. Teubner.
- Aeschines (scholia): Dilts, M. R., ed. (1992). Scholia in Aeschinem. Stuttgart – Leipzig: B. G. Teubner.
- Aeschylus (1990). West, M. L. (ed.). Tragoediae cum incerti poetae Prometheo. Stuttgart – Leipzig: B. G. Teubner.
- Aeschylus (1991a). West, M. L. (ed.). Eumenides. Stuttgart – Leipzig: B. G. Teubner.
- Aeschylus (1991b). West, M. L. (ed.). Persae. Stuttgart – Leipzig: B. G. Teubner.
- Aeschylus (1992a). West, M. L. (ed.). Prometheus. Stuttgart – Leipzig: B. G. Teubner.
- Aeschylus (1992b). West, M. L. (ed.). Septem contra Thebas. Stuttgart – Leipzig: B. G. Teubner.
- Aeschylus (1992c). West, M. L. (ed.). Supplices. Stuttgart – Leipzig: B. G. Teubner.
- Aeschylus (1998). West, M. L. (ed.). Tragoediae cum incerti poetae Prometheo (2nd ed.). Stuttgart – Leipzig: B. G. Teubner.
- Aeschylus (1999). West, M. L. (ed.). Choephoroe. Stuttgart: B. G. Teubner.
- Aeschylus (2009). West, M. L. (ed.). Agamemnon. BT 1015. Berlin – New York: Walter de Gruyter.
- Aeschylus (scholia): Smith, O. L., ed. (1993). Scholia Graeca in Aeschylum. Vol. I (2nd ed.). Stuttgart – Leipzig: B. G. Teubner.
- Aeschylus (scholia): Smith, O. L., ed. (2009). Scholia Graeca in Aeschylum. Vol. II.2. Stuttgart – Leipzig: Walter de Gruyter.
- Aesopian fables: Hausrath, A.; Hunger, H., eds. (1969). Corpus fabularum aesopicarum. Vol. I.2 (2nd ed.). Leipzig: B. G. Teubner.
- Aesopian fables: Hausrath, A.; Hunger, H., eds. (1970). Corpus fabularum aesopicarum. Vol. I.1 (2nd ed.). Leipzig: B. G. Teubner.
- Alciphron (1905). Schepers, M. A. (ed.). Epistulae. Leipzig: B. G. Teubner.
- Ammianus Marcellinus (1874). Gardthausen, V. (ed.). Res gestae. Vol. I. Leipzig: B. G. Teubner.
- Ammianus Marcellinus (1875). Gardthausen, V. (ed.). Res gestae. Vol. II. Leipzig: B. G. Teubner.
- Ammianus Marcellinus (1978a). Seyfarth, W. (ed.). Res gestae. Vol. I. Leipzig: B. G. Teubner.
- Ammianus Marcellinus (1978b). Seyfarth, W. (ed.). Res gestae. Vol. II. Leipzig: B. G. Teubner.
- Anacreontics: West, M. L., ed. (1984). Anacreontea. Leipzig: B. G. Teubner.
- Anacreontics: West, M. L., ed. (1993). Anacreontea (2nd ed.). Stuttgart – Leipzig: B. G. Teubner.
- Andocides (1913). Blass, F.; Fuhr, C. (eds.). Orationes (4th ed.). Leipzig: B. G. Teubner.
- Anthologia Graeca: Sternbach, L., ed. (1890). Appendix Barberino-Vaticana. Leipzig: B. G. Teubner.
- Anthologia Graeca: Stadtmüller, H., ed. (1894). Anthologia Graeca. Vol. I. Leipzig: B. G. Teubner.
- Anthologia Graeca: Stadtmüller, H., ed. (1899). Anthologia Graeca. Vol. II.1. Leipzig: B. G. Teubner.
- Anthologia Graeca: Stadtmüller, H., ed. (1906). Anthologia Graeca. Vol. III.1. Leipzig: B. G. Teubner.
- Anthologia Latina: Shackleton Bailey, D. R., ed. (1972). Carmina in codicibus scripta. Vol. I. Stuttgart: B. G. Teubner.
- Anthologia Latina: Riese, A., ed. (1906). Carmina in codicibus scripta. Vol. II. Leipzig: B. G. Teubner.
- Anthologia Latina: Buecheler, F., ed. (1885). Carmina Latina epigraphica. Vol. I. Leipzig: B. G. Teubner.
- Anthologia Latina: Buecheler, F., ed. (1887). Carmina Latina epigraphica. Vol. II. Leipzig: B. G. Teubner.
- Anthologia Latina: Lommatzsch, E., ed. (1926). Carmina Latina epigraphica. Vol. III. Leipzig: B. G. Teubner.
- Anthologia Latina: Cugusi, P.; Sblendorio Cugusi, M. T., eds. (2023). Carmina Latina epigraphica. Vol. IV.1. Leipzig: Walter de Gruyter.
- Antiphon (1914). Blass, F.; Thalheim, T. (eds.). Orationes et fragmenta. Leipzig: B. G. Teubner.
- Anubio (2006). Obbink, D. (ed.). Carmen astrologicum elegiacum. München – Leipzig: K. G. Saur.
- Apicius (1969). Milham, M. E. (ed.). De re coquinaria. Leipzig: B. G. Teubner.
- Aratus (scholia): Martin, J., ed. (1974). Scholia in Aratum vetera. Stuttgart – Leipzig: B. G. Teubner.
- Archimedes (1910). Heiberg, J. L. (ed.). Opera. Vol. I. Leipzig: B. G. Teubner.
- Archimedes (1913). Heiberg, J. L. (ed.). Opera. Vol. II. Leipzig: B. G. Teubner.
- Archimedes (1915). Heiberg, J. L. (ed.). Opera. Vol. III. Leipzig: B. G. Teubner.
- Arethas (1967). Westerink, L. G. (ed.). Scripta minora. Vol. I. Leipzig: B. G. Teubner.
- Arethas (1972). Westerink, L. G. (ed.). Scripta minora. Vol. II. Leipzig: B. G. Teubner.
- Aristaenetus (1971). Mazal, O. (ed.). Epistulae. Leipzig: B. G. Teubner.
- Aristaea (1900). Wendland, P. (ed.). Epistula ad Philocratem. Leipzig: B. G. Teubner.
- Athenaeus (1887a). Kaibel, G. (ed.). Dipnosophistae. Vol. I. Leipzig: B. G. Teubner.
- Athenaeus (1887b). Kaibel, G. (ed.). Dipnosophistae. Vol. II. Leipzig: B. G. Teubner.
- Athenaeus (1890). Kaibel, G. (ed.). Dipnosophistae. Vol. III. Leipzig: B. G. Teubner.
- Athenaeus (2019). Olson, S. D. (ed.). Deipnosophistae. Vol. IV. Berlin – New York: Walter de Gruyter.
- Athenaeus (2020). Olson, S. D. (ed.). Deipnosophistae. Vol. III. Berlin – New York: Walter de Gruyter.
- Athenaeus (2021). Olson, S. D. (ed.). Deipnosophistae. Vol. II. Berlin – New York: Walter de Gruyter.
- Athenaeus (2022). Olson, S. D. (ed.). Deipnosophistae. Vol. V. Berlin – New York: Walter de Gruyter.
- Athenaeus (2023). Olson, S. D. (ed.). Deipnosophistae. Vol. I. Berlin – New York: Walter de Gruyter.
- Babrius (1986). Luzzatto, M. J.; La Penna, A. (eds.). Mythiambi Aesopei. Leipzig: B. G. Teubner.
- Bacchylides (2003). Maehler, H. (ed.). Carmina cum fragmentis (11th ed.). München – Leipzig: K. G. Saur.
- Basilaca, N. (1984). Garzya, A. (ed.). Orationes et epistolae. Leipzig: B. G. Teubner.
- Chariton (2004). Reardon, B. P. (ed.). Callirhoe. München – Leipzig: B. G. Teubner.
- Choricius (1929). Förster, R.; Richsteig, E. (eds.). Opera. Leipzig: B. G. Teubner.
- Cicero (scholia): Hildebrandt, P., ed. (1907). Scholia in Ciceronis orationes Bobiensia. Leipzig: B. G. Teubner.
- Claudianus, Cl. (1985). Hall, J. B. (ed.). Carmina. Leipzig: B. G. Teubner.
- Constantinus Rhodius; Theodorus Paphlago (2021). De Stefani, Cl.; Strano, G. (eds.). Ecphrasis Ecclesiae Sanctorum Apostolorum. Carmina scoptica. BT 2046. Berlin – New York: Walter de Gruyter.
- Curtius Rufus, Q. (2009). Lucarini, C. M. (ed.). Historiae. Berlin – New York: Walter de Gruyter.
- Demosthenes (scholia): Dilts, M. R., ed. (1983). Scholia Demosthenica. Vol. I. Leipzig: B. G. Teubner.
- Demosthenes (scholia): Dilts, M. R., ed. (1986). Scholia Demosthenica. Vol. II. Leipzig: B. G. Teubner.
- Dinarchus (1975). Conomis, N. C. (ed.). Orationes. Leipzig: B. G. Teubner.
- Diodorus Siculus (1888). Vogel, F. (ed.). Bibliotheca. Vol. I (3rd ed.). Leipzig: B. G. Teubner.
- Diodorus Siculus (1890). Vogel, F. (ed.). Bibliotheca. Vol. II (3rd ed.). Leipzig: B. G. Teubner.
- Diodorus Siculus (1893). Vogel, F. (ed.). Bibliotheca. Vol. III (3rd ed.). Leipzig: B. G. Teubner.
- Diodorus Siculus (1906a). Fischer, C. T. (ed.). Bibliotheca. Vol. IV (3rd ed.). Leipzig: B. G. Teubner.
- Diodorus Siculus (1906b). Fischer, C. T. (ed.). Bibliotheca. Vol. V (3rd ed.). Leipzig: B. G. Teubner.
- Diogenes Laërtius (1999a). Marcovich, M. (ed.). Vitae Philosophorum. Vol. I. München – Leipzig: K. G. Saur.
- Diogenes Laërtius (1999b). Marcovich, M. (ed.). Vitae Philosophorum. Vol. II. München – Leipzig: K. G. Saur.
- Diogenes Laërtius (2002). Marcovich, M. (ed.). Vitae Philosophorum. Vol. III. München – Leipzig: K. G. Saur.
- Dionysius (1963). Garzya, A. (ed.). Ixeuticon. Leipzig: B. G. Teubner.
- Dionysius Halicarnasseus (1885). Jacoby, K. (ed.). Antiquitates Romanae. Vol. I. Leipzig: B. G. Teubner.
- Dionysius Halicarnasseus (1888). Jacoby, K. (ed.). Antiquitates Romanae. Vol. II. Leipzig: B. G. Teubner.
- Dionysius Halicarnasseus (1891). Jacoby, K. (ed.). Antiquitates Romanae. Vol. III. Leipzig: B. G. Teubner.
- Dionysius Halicarnasseus (1899). Usener, H.; Radermacher, L. (eds.). Opuscula. Vol. I. Leipzig: B. G. Teubner.
- Dionysius Halicarnasseus (1904). Usener, H.; Radermacher, L. (eds.). Opuscula. Vol. II. Leipzig: B. G. Teubner.
- Dionysius Halicarnasseus (1905). Jacoby, K. (ed.). Antiquitates Romanae. Vol. IV. Leipzig: B. G. Teubner.
- Diophantus Alexandrinus (1893). Tannery, P. (ed.). Opera omnia. Vol. I. Leipzig: B. G. Teubner.
- Diophantus Alexandrinus (1895). Tannery, P. (ed.). Opera omnia. Vol. II. Leipzig: B. G. Teubner.
- Donatus, Ae. (1902). Wessner, P. (ed.). Commentum Terenti. Vol. I. Leipzig: B. G. Teubner.
- Donatus, Ae. (1905). Wessner, P. (ed.). Commentum Terenti. Vol. II. Leipzig: B. G. Teubner.
- Donatus, Ae. (1908). Wessner, P. (ed.). Commentum Terenti. Vol. III.1. Leipzig: B. G. Teubner.
- Donatus, Ae. (2017). Cioffi, C. (ed.). Commentum ad Andriam Terenti. BT 2023. Berlin – New York: Walter de Gruyter.
- Donatus, T. Cl. (1905). Georgii, H. (ed.). Interpretationes Vergilianae. Vol. I. Leipzig: B. G. Teubner.
- Donatus, T. Cl. (1908–1912). Georgii, H.; Brummer, J. (eds.). Interpretationes Vergilianae. Vitae Vergilianae. Vol. II. Leipzig: B. G. Teubner.
- Duca Lascaris, T. II (2000). Tartaglia, L. (ed.). Opuscula. München – Leipzig: K. G. Saur.
- Elegy (Greek): Gentili, B.; Prato, C., eds. (1978). Poetarum elegiacorum testimonia et fragmenta. Vol. I. Leipzig: B. G. Teubner.
- Elegy (Greek): Gentili, B.; Prato, C., eds. (1984). Poetarum elegiacorum testimonia et fragmenta. Vol. II. Leipzig: B. G. Teubner.
- Elegy (Greek): Gentili, B.; Prato, C., eds. (1988). Poetarum elegiacorum testimonia et fragmenta. Vol. I (2nd ed.). Leipzig: B. G. Teubner.
- Elegy (Greek): Gentili, B.; Prato, C., eds. (2002). Poetarum elegiacorum testimonia et fragmenta. Vol. II (2nd ed.). Stuttgart – Leipzig: K. G. Saur.
- Epic (Greek): Bernabé, A., ed. (1987). Poetarum epicorum Graecorum testimonia et fragmenta. Vol. I. Leipzig: B. G. Teubner.
- Epic (Greek): Bernabé, A., ed. (1996). Poetarum epicorum Graecorum testimonia et fragmenta. Vol. I (2nd ed.). Stuttgart – Leipzig: B. G. Teubner.
- Epic (Greek): Bernabé, A., ed. (2004). Poetae epici Graeci. Testimonia et fragmenta. Vol. II.1. München – Leipzig: K. G. Saur.
- Epic (Greek): Bernabé, A., ed. (2005). Poetae epici Graeci. Testimonia et fragmenta. Vol. II.2. München – Leipzig: K. G. Saur.
- Epic (Greek): Bernabé, A., ed. (2007). Poetae epici Graeci. Testimonia et fragmenta. Vol. II.3. Berlin – New York: Walter de Gruyter.
- Epic parody (Greek): Brandt, P., ed. (1885). Corpusculum poesis Graecae ludibundae. Vol. II. Leipzig: B. G. Teubner.
- Epic parody (Greek): Brandt, P., ed. (1888). Corpusculum poesis Graecae ludibundae. Vol. I. Leipzig: B. G. Teubner.
- Euclides (1969). Heiberg, J. L.; Stamatis, E. S. (eds.). Elementa. Vol. I. Leipzig: B. G. Teubner.
- Euclides (1970). Heiberg, J. L.; Stamatis, E. S. (eds.). Elementa. Vol. II. Leipzig: B. G. Teubner.
- Euclides (1972). Heiberg, J. L.; Stamatis, E. S. (eds.). Elementa. Vol. III. Leipzig: B. G. Teubner.
- Euclides (1973). Heiberg, J. L.; Stamatis, E. S. (eds.). Elementa. Vol. IV. Leipzig: B. G. Teubner.
- Euclides (1977). Heiberg, J. L.; Stamatis, E. S. (eds.). Elementa. Vol. V (2 tomes). Leipzig: B. G. Teubner.
- Euripides (1902a). Nauck, A. (ed.). Tragoediae. Vol. I. Leipzig: B. G. Teubner.
- Euripides (1902b). Nauck, A. (ed.). Tragoediae. Vol. II. Leipzig: B. G. Teubner.
- Euripides (1902c). Nauck, A. (ed.). Tragoediae. Vol. III. Leipzig: B. G. Teubner.
- Euripides (1970). Biehl, W. (ed.). Troades. Leipzig: B. G. Teubner.
- Euripides (1972). Garzya, A. (ed.). Heraclidae. Leipzig: B. G. Teubner.
- Euripides (1978). Garzya, A. (ed.). Andromacha. Leipzig: B. G. Teubner.
- Euripides (1979). Biehl, W. (ed.). Ion. Leipzig: B. G. Teubner.
- Euripides (1981). Sansone, D. (ed.). Iphigenia in Tauris. Leipzig: B. G. Teubner.
- Euripides (1982). Kopff, E. C. (ed.). Bacchae. Leipzig: B. G. Teubner.
- Euripides (1983). Garzya, A. (ed.). Alcestis. Leipzig: B. G. Teubner.
- Euripides (1988a). Günther, H. C. (ed.). Iphigenia Aulidensis. Leipzig: B. G. Teubner.
- Euripides (1988b). Mastronarde, D. J. (ed.). Phoenissae. Leipzig: B. G. Teubner.
- Euripides (1990). Daitz, S. G. (ed.). Hecuba. Leipzig: B. G. Teubner.
- Euripides (1992). Van Looy, H. (ed.). Medea. Stuttgart – Leipzig: B. G. Teubner.
- Euripides (1993). Zanetto, G. (ed.). Rhesus. Stuttgart – Leipzig: B. G. Teubner.
- Euripides (1994). Stockert, W. (ed.). Hippolytus. Stuttgart – Leipzig: B. G. Teubner.
- Euripides (1995). Basta Donzelli, G. (ed.). Electra. Stuttgart – Leipzig: B. G. Teubner.
- Euripides (2002). Basta Donzelli, G. (ed.). Electra (2nd ed.). München – Leipzig: K. G. Saur.
- Hermeneumata Pseudo-Dositheana: Flammini, G., ed. (2004). Hermeneumata Pseudodositheana Leidensia. München – Leipzig: K. G. Saur.
- Hermias (2012). Lucarini, C. M.; Moreschini, Cl. (eds.). In Platonis Phaedrum scholia. BT 2010. Berlin – New York: Walter de Gruyter.
- Herodianus (2005). Lucarini, C. M. (ed.). Regnum post Marcum. Berlin – New York: Walter de Gruyter.
- Homerus (1962). Von der Mühll, P. (ed.). Odyssea. Stuttgart: B. G. Teubner.
- Homerus (1998). West, M. L. (ed.). Ilias. Vol. I. München – Leipzig: K. G. Saur.
- Homerus (2000). West, M. L. (ed.). Ilias. Vol. II. München – Leipzig: K. G. Saur.
- Homerus (2017). West, M. L. (†) (ed.). Odyssea. BT 2026. Berlin – New York: Walter de Gruyter.
- Horatius (2001). Shackleton Bailey, D. R. (ed.). Opera (4th ed.). München – Leipzig: K. G. Saur.
- Horatius (scholia): Pseudoacro (1902). Keller, O. (ed.). Scholia in Horatium vetustiora. Vol. I. Leipzig: B. G. Teubner.
- Horatius (scholia): Pseudoacro (1904). Keller, O. (ed.). Scholia in Horatium vetustiora. Vol. II. Leipzig: B. G. Teubner.
- Iamblichus (1960). Habrich, E. (ed.). Babyloniacorum reliquiae. Leipzig: B. G. Teubner.
- Iuvenalis (scholia): Wessner, P., ed. (1931). Scholia in Iuvenalem. Leipzig: B. G. Teubner.
- Longus (1994). Reeve, M. D. (ed.). Daphnis et Chloe (3rd ed.). München – Leipzig: K. G. Saur.
- Lycophron (1964). Mascialino, L. (ed.). Alexandra. Leipzig: B. G. Teubner.
- Lucanus (2009). Shackleton Bailey, D. R. (ed.). De bello civili. Berlin – New York: Walter de Gruyter.
- Lucanus (scholia): Endt, J., ed. (1909). Adnotationes super Lucanum. Leipzig: B. G. Teubner.
- Lucianus (scholia): Rabe, H., ed. (1906). Scholia in Lucianum. Leipzig: B. G. Teubner.
- Macrembolites, E. (2001). Marcovich, M. (ed.). De Hysmines et Hysminiae amoribus. München – Leipzig: K. G. Saur.
- Metochites, Th. (2019). Polemis, I.; Kaltsogianni, E. (eds.). Orationes. BT 2031. Berlin – New York: Walter de Gruyter.
- Martialis (1990). Shackleton Bailey, D. R. (ed.). Epigrammata. Leipzig: B. G. Teubner.
- Musaeus (1982). Livrea, E.; Eleuteri, P. (eds.). Hero et Leander. Leipzig: B. G. Teubner.
- Nilus Ancyranus (1983). Conca, F. (ed.). Narratio. Leipzig: B. G. Teubner.
- Nonnus Panopolitanus (1881). Scheindler, A. (ed.). Paraphrasis s. Evangelii Ioannaei. Leipzig: B. G. Teubner.
- Olympiodorus (1970). Westerink, L. G. (ed.). In Platonis Gorgiam commentaria. Leipzig: B. G. Teubner.
- Oppianus; Eutecnius (2003). Papathomopoulos, M. (ed.). Cynegetica; Paraphrasis metro soluta. München – Leipzig: K. G. Saur.
- Pamprepius (1979). Livrea, E. (ed.). Carmina (P.Vindob. G 29788A–C). Leipzig: B. G. Teubner.
- Paulinus Pellaeus (2006). Lucarini, C. M. (ed.). Carmina. München – Leipzig: K. G. Saur.
- Pausanias (1989a). Rocha-Pereira, M. H. (ed.). Graeciae descriptio. Vol. I. Leipzig: B. G. Teubner.
- Pausanias (1989b). Rocha-Pereira, M. H. (ed.). Graeciae descriptio. Vol. III. Leipzig: B. G. Teubner.
- Pausanias (1990). Rocha-Pereira, M. H. (ed.). Graeciae descriptio. Vol. II. Leipzig: B. G. Teubner.
- Persius (2007). Kissel, W. (ed.). Saturae. Berlin – New York: Walter de Gruyter.
- Petronius (1995). Müller, K. (ed.). Satyricon reliquiae (4th ed.). Stuttgart – Leipzig: B. G. Teubner.
- Philodemus (1906). Jansen, C. (ed.). Περὶ οἰκονομίας. Leipzig: B. G. Teubner.
- Philodemus (1914). Wilke, C. (ed.). De ira. Leipzig: B. G. Teubner.
- Philogelos: Dawe, R. D., ed. (2000). Philogelos. München – Leipzig: K. G. Saur.
- Philoponus, I. (2015). Stückelberger, A. (ed.). De usu astrolabii eiusque constructione. BT 2016. Berlin – New York: Walter de Gruyter.
- Philostratus (1870). Kayser, C. L. (ed.). Opera auctiora. Vol. I. Leipzig: B. G. Teubner.
- Philostratus (1871). Kayser, C. L. (ed.). Opera auctiora. Vol. II. Leipzig: B. G. Teubner.
- Philostratus (1977). Van Lannoy, L. (ed.). Heroicus. Leipzig: B. G. Teubner.
- Philostratus (2022). Boter, G. (ed.). Vita Apollonii Tyanei. BT 2043. Berlin – New York: Walter de Gruyter.
- Phlegon Trallianus (2011). Stramaglia, A. (ed.). Opuscula de rebus mirabilibus et de longaevis. BT 2008. Berlin – New York: Walter de Gruyter.
- Photius (1983). Laourdas, B.; Westerink, L. G. (eds.). Epistulae et Amphilochia. Vol. I. Leipzig: B. G. Teubner.
- Photius (1984). Laourdas, B.; Westerink, L. G. (eds.). Epistulae et Amphilochia. Vol. II. Leipzig: B. G. Teubner.
- Photius (1985). Laourdas, B.; Westerink, L. G. (eds.). Epistulae et Amphilochia. Vol. III. Leipzig: B. G. Teubner.
- Photius (1986a). Westerink, L. G. (ed.). Epistulae et Amphilochia. Vol. IV. Leipzig: B. G. Teubner.
- Photius (1986b). Westerink, L. G. (ed.). Epistulae et Amphilochia. Vol. V. Leipzig: B. G. Teubner.
- Photius (1987). Westerink, L. G. (ed.). Epistulae et Amphilochia. Vol. VI.1. Leipzig: B. G. Teubner.
- Photius (1988). Westerink, L. G. (ed.). Epistulae et Amphilochia. Vol. VI.2. Leipzig: B. G. Teubner.
- Pindarus (1964a). Snell, B. (ed.). Carmina. Vol. I (4th ed.). Leipzig: B. G. Teubner.
- Pindarus (1964b). Snell, B. (ed.). Carmina. Vol. II (3rd ed.). Leipzig: B. G. Teubner.
- Pindarus (1987). Snell, B.; Maehler, H. (eds.). Carmina. Vol. I (8th ed.). Leipzig: B. G. Teubner.
- Pindarus (1989). Maehler, H. (ed.). Carmina. Vol. II. Leipzig: B. G. Teubner.
- Pindarus (scholia): Drachmann, A. B., ed. (1903). Scholia vetera in Pindari carmina. Vol. I. Leipzig: B. G. Teubner.
- Pindarus (scholia): Drachmann, A. B., ed. (1910). Scholia vetera in Pindari carmina. Vol. II. Leipzig: B. G. Teubner.
- Pindarus (scholia): Drachmann, A. B., ed. (1927). Scholia vetera in Pindari carmina. Vol. III. Leipzig: B. G. Teubner.
- Pindarus (scholia): Tessier, A., ed. (1989). Scholia metrica vetera in Pindari carmina. Leipzig: B. G. Teubner.
- Plato (1985). Moore-Blunt, J. (ed.). Epistulae. Leipzig: B. G. Teubner.
- Plethon, G. G. (1988). Maltese, E. V. (ed.). Contra Scholarii pro Aristotele obiectiones. Leipzig: B. G. Teubner.
- Plethon, G. G. (1989). Maltese, E. V. (ed.). Opuscula de historia Graeca. Leipzig: B. G. Teubner.
- Plutarchus (1929). Paton, W. R.; Pohlenz, M.; Sieveking, W. (eds.). Moralia. Vol. I. Leipzig: B. G. Teubner.
- Plutarchus (1960a). Drexler, H.; Hubert, C.; Pohlenz, M. (eds.). Moralia. Vol. V.1 (2nd ed.). Leipzig: B. G. Teubner.
- Plutarchus (1960b). Drexler, H.; Hubert, C.; Pohlenz, M. (eds.). Moralia. Vol. V.3 (2nd ed.). Leipzig: B. G. Teubner.
- Plutarchus (1958a). Drexler, H.; Hubert, C. (eds.). Moralia. Vol. VI.1 (2nd ed.). Leipzig: B. G. Teubner.
- Plutarchus (1958b). Drexler, H.; Hubert, C. (eds.). Moralia. Vol. VI.2 (2nd ed.). Leipzig: B. G. Teubner.
- Plutarchus (1966). Pohlenz, M.; Ziegler, K. (eds.). Moralia. Vol. VI.3 (3rd ed.). Leipzig: B. G. Teubner.
- Plutarchus (1971a). Nachstädt, W.; Sieveking, W.; Titchener, J. B. (eds.). Moralia. Vol. II. Leipzig: B. G. Teubner.
- Plutarchus (1971b). Hubert, C. (ed.). Moralia. Vol. IV. Leipzig: B. G. Teubner.
- Plutarchus (1971c). Mau, J. (ed.). Moralia. Vol. V.2.1. Leipzig: B. G. Teubner.
- Plutarchus (1973). Ziegler, K. (ed.). Vitae parallelae. Vol. III.2 (2nd ed.). Leipzig: B. G. Teubner.
- Plutarchus (1978). Häsler, B. (ed.). Moralia. Vol. V.2.2. Leipzig: B. G. Teubner.
- Plutarchus (1990). Kindstrand, J. F. (ed.). De Homero. Leipzig: B. G. Teubner.
- Plutarchus (1993). Gärtner, H.; Ziegler, K. (eds.). Vitae parallelae. Vol. II.1 (3rd ed.). Stuttgart – Leipzig: B. G. Teubner.
- Plutarchus (1994a). Gärtner, H.; Ziegler, K. (eds.). Vitae parallelae. Vol. I.2 (3rd ed.). Stuttgart – Leipzig: B. G. Teubner.
- Plutarchus (1994b). Gärtner, H.; Ziegler, K. (eds.). Vitae parallelae. Vol. II.2 (3rd ed.). Stuttgart – Leipzig: B. G. Teubner.
- Plutarchus (1996). Gärtner, H.; Ziegler, K. (eds.). Vitae parallelae. Vol. III.1 (3rd ed.). Stuttgart – Leipzig: B. G. Teubner.
- Plutarchus (1998). Gärtner, H.; Ziegler, K. (eds.). Vitae parallelae. Vol. IV. Indices (3rd ed.). Stuttgart – Leipzig: B. G. Teubner.
- Plutarchus (2000). Gärtner, H.; Ziegler, K. (eds.). Vitae parallelae. Vol. I.1 (5th ed.). Stuttgart – Leipzig: B. G. Teubner.
- Plutarchus (1997). Gärtner, H.; Sieveking, W. (eds.). Pythici dialogi (2nd ed.). Leipzig: B. G. Teubner.
- Polybius (1882). Büttner-Wobst, T. (ed.). Historiae. Vol. I. Leipzig: B. G. Teubner.
- Polybius (1889). Büttner-Wobst, T. (ed.). Historiae. Vol. II. Leipzig: B. G. Teubner.
- Polybius (1893). Büttner-Wobst, T. (ed.). Historiae. Vol. III. Leipzig: B. G. Teubner.
- Polybius (1904a). Büttner-Wobst, T. (ed.). Historiae. Vol. IV. Leipzig: B. G. Teubner.
- Polybius (1904b). Büttner-Wobst, T. (ed.). Historiae. Vol. V. Leipzig: B. G. Teubner.
- Polybius (1905). Büttner-Wobst, T. (ed.). Historiae. Vol. I (2nd ed.). Leipzig: B. G. Teubner.
- Porphyrius (1860). Nauck, A. (ed.). Opuscula tria. Leipzig: B. G. Teubner.
- Porphyrius (1886). Nauck, A. (ed.). Opuscula selecta (2nd ed.). Leipzig: B. G. Teubner.
- Porphyrius (1975). Lamberz, E. (ed.). Sententiae ad intelligibilia ducentes. Leipzig: B. G. Teubner.
- Porphyrius (1993). Smith, A.; Wasserstein, D. (eds.). Fragmenta. Stuttgart – Leipzig: B. G. Teubner.
- Porphyrius (2016). Raffa, M.; Barker, A. (eds.). Commentarius in Cl. Ptolemaei Harmonica. BT 2020. Berlin – New York: Walter de Gruyter.
- Priscus Panita (2008). Carolla, P. (ed.). Excerpta et fragmenta. BT 2000. Berlin – New York: Walter de Gruyter.
- Proclus Diadochus (1903). Diehl, E. (ed.). In Platonis Timaeum commentaria. Vol. I. Leipzig: B. G. Teubner.
- Proclus Diadochus (1904). Diehl, E. (ed.). In Platonis Timaeum commentaria. Vol. II. Leipzig: B. G. Teubner.
- Proclus Diadochus (1906). Diehl, E. (ed.). In Platonis Timaeum commentaria. Vol. III. Leipzig: B. G. Teubner.
- Proclus Diadochus (1908). Pasquali, G. (ed.). In Platonis Cratylum commentaria. Leipzig: B. G. Teubner.
- Proclus Diadochus (1974). Manitius, C. (ed.). Hypotyposis astronomicarum positionum. Leipzig: B. G. Teubner.
- Psellus, M. (1985). Littlewood, A. R. (ed.). Oratoria minora. Leipzig: B. G. Teubner.
- Psellus, M. (1989a). O'Meara, D. J. (ed.). Philosophica minora. Vol. II. Leipzig: B. G. Teubner.
- Psellus, M. (1989b). Gautier, P. (ed.). Theologica. Vol. I. Leipzig: B. G. Teubner.
- Psellus, M. (1992a). Duffy, J. M. (ed.). Philosophica minora. Vol. I. Leipzig: B. G. Teubner.
- Psellus, M. (1992b). Westerink, L. G. (ed.). Poemata. Leipzig: B. G. Teubner.
- Psellus, M. (1994a). Dennis, G. T. (ed.). Orationes forenses et acta. Leipzig: B. G. Teubner.
- Psellus, M. (1994b). Fisher, E. A. (ed.). Orationes hagiographicae. Leipzig: B. G. Teubner.
- Psellus, M. (1994c). Dennis, G. T. (ed.). Orationes panegyricae. Leipzig: B. G. Teubner.
- Psellus, M. (2002). Gautier, P. (†); Duffy, J. M. (eds.). Theologica. Vol. II. München – Leipzig: K. G. Saur.
- Psellus, M. (2014). Polemis, I. (ed.). Orationes funebres. BT 2013. Vol. I. Berlin – New York: Walter de Gruyter.
- Psellus, M. (2019a). Papaioannou, S. (ed.). Epistulae. BT 2030. Vol. I. Berlin – New York: Walter de Gruyter.
- Psellus, M. (2019b). Papaioannou, S. (ed.). Epistulae. BT 2030. Vol. II. Berlin – New York: Walter de Gruyter.
- Proba (2011). Fassina, A.; Lucarini, C. M. (eds.). Cento Vergilianus. Berlin – New York: Walter de Gruyter.
- Prodromus, Th. (1992). Marcovich, M. (ed.). De Rhodantes et Dosiclis amoribus. Stuttgart – Leipzig: B. G. Teubner.
- Quintilianus (1959). Radermacher, L.; Buchheit, V. (eds.). Institutio oratoria. Vol. II (2nd ed.). Leipzig: B. G. Teubner.
- Quintilianus (1965). Radermacher, L.; Buchheit, V. (eds.). Institutio oratoria. Vol. I (2nd ed.). Leipzig: B. G. Teubner.
- Quintilianus (1982). Håkanson, L. (ed.). Declamationes XIX maiores falso adscriptae. Stuttgart: B. G. Teubner.
- Quintilianus (1989). Shackleton Bailey, D. R. (ed.). Declamationes minores. Stuttgart: B. G. Teubner.
- Silentiarius, P. (2011). De Stefani, Cl. (ed.). Descriptio Sanctae Sophiae. Descriptio Ambonis. Vol. BT 2011. Berlin – New York: Walter de Gruyter.
- Simocata, Th. (1985). Zanetto, G. (ed.). Epistulae. Leipzig: B. G. Teubner.
- Sophocles (1975). Dawe, R. D. (ed.). Tragoediae. Vol. I. Leipzig: B. G. Teubner.
- Sophocles (1979). Dawe, R. D. (ed.). Tragoediae. Vol. II. Leipzig: B. G. Teubner.
- Sophocles (1984). Dawe, R. D. (ed.). Tragoediae. Vol. I (2nd ed.). Leipzig: B. G. Teubner.
- Sophocles (1985). Dawe, R. D. (ed.). Tragoediae. Vol. II (2nd ed.). Leipzig: B. G. Teubner.
- Sophocles (1996a). Dawe, R. D. (ed.). Ajax (3rd ed.). Stuttgart – Leipzig: B. G. Teubner.
- Sophocles (1996b). Dawe, R. D. (ed.). Antigone (3rd ed.). Stuttgart – Leipzig: B. G. Teubner.
- Sophocles (1996c). Dawe, R. D. (ed.). Electra (3rd ed.). Stuttgart – Leipzig: B. G. Teubner.
- Sophocles (1996d). Dawe, R. D. (ed.). Oedipus Coloneus (3rd ed.). Stuttgart – Leipzig: B. G. Teubner.
- Sophocles (1996e). Dawe, R. D. (ed.). Oedipus Rex (3rd ed.). Stuttgart – Leipzig: B. G. Teubner.
- Sophocles (1996f). Dawe, R. D. (ed.). Philoctetes (3rd ed.). Stuttgart – Leipzig: B. G. Teubner.
- Sophocles (1996g). Dawe, R. D. (ed.). Trachiniae (3rd ed.). Stuttgart – Leipzig: B. G. Teubner.
- Stobaeus (2025). Dorandi, T. (ed.). Anthologion. BT 2050. Vol. I. Berlin – New York: Walter de Gruyter.
- Terentius (scholia): Schlee, F., ed. (1893). Scholia Terentiana. Leipzig: B. G. Teubner.
- Themistius (1951). Schenkl, H. (†); Downey, G. (eds.). Orationes. Vol. I. Leipzig: B. G. Teubner.
- Themistius (1965). Downey, G.; Norman, A. F. (eds.). Orationes. Vol. II. Leipzig: B. G. Teubner.
- Themistius (1974). Downey, G.; Norman, A. F. (eds.). Orationes. Vol. III. Leipzig: B. G. Teubner.
- Theognis (1971). Young, D. (ed.). Carmina (2nd ed.). Leipzig: B. G. Teubner.
- Theocritus (scholia): Wendel, K., ed. (1914). Scholia in Theocritum vetera. Leipzig: B. G. Teubner.
- Tryphiodorus (1982). Livrea, E. (ed.). Ilii excidium. Leipzig: B. G. Teubner.
- Thudydides (scholia): Hude, K., ed. (1927). Scholia in Thucydidem. Leipzig: B. G. Teubner.
- Tzetzes, I. (1972). Leone, P. L. M. (ed.). Epistulae. Leipzig: B. G. Teubner.
- Vergilius (2009). Conte, G. B. (ed.). Aeneis. Vol. BT 2005. Berlin – New York: Walter de Gruyter.
- Vergilius (2013). Conte, G. B.; Ottaviano, S. (eds.). Bucolica et Georgica. Vol. BT 2011. Berlin – New York: Walter de Gruyter.
- Vergilius (2019). Conte, G. B. (ed.). Aeneis. Vol. BT 2040 (2nd ed.). Berlin – New York: Walter de Gruyter.
- Vettius Valens (1986). Pingree, D. (ed.). Anthologiae. Leipzig: B. G. Teubner.
- Xenophon Ephesius (1973). Papanikolaou, A. D. (ed.). Ephesiaca (De Anthia et Habrocome). Leipzig: B. G. Teubner.
- Xenophon Ephesius (2005). O'Sullivan, J. N. (ed.). De Anthia et Habrocome. München – Leipzig: K. G. Saur.

== See also ==
- Stiftung Benedictus Gotthelf Teubner
- VEB Akademische Verlagsgesellschaft (AVG)
- Verlag Harri Deutsch
- Edition Leipzig
