= Poetae Epici Graeci =

Edition of Ancient Greek fragments

Cover of Poetae Epici Graeci, Volume II, Fascicle 1

Poetae Epici Graeci (abbreviated PEG) (Note: Poetae Epici Graeci is Latin for "Greek Epic Poets"; the first volume of PEG covers the fragments of early Greek epic poetry, and the latter volume the fragments related to Orphic literature (texts attributed in antiquity to the mythical poet Orpheus).) is an edition of fragments of ancient Greek literature. It was edited by the philologist Alberto Bernabé, and published between 1987 and 2007. Its first volume brings together passages containing information from or about lost works of early Greek epic poetry. It opens with the fragments of the Epic Cycle, a collection of poems composed around the 7th and 6th centuries BC, and proceeds in roughly chronological order through to works from the 5th century BC. It was the first complete edition of early Greek epic published since 1877. A separate edition covering the same genre appeared in 1988, produced independently by Malcolm Davies.

The second volume of PEG collects fragments related to Orphic literature, the tradition of texts attributed in antiquity to the mythical poet Orpheus. The volume comprises three fascicles (or instalments), the first two of which include fragments pertaining to lost Orphic texts, Orpheus, and Orphic rites, among other topics. These initial two fascicles contain a total of 1151 fragments, the first 378 of which are assigned to the Orphic theogonies, works concerned with the origins and genealogies of the gods. The third fascicle presents the fragments of Musaeus, Linus, and Epimenides, three mythical or semi-mythical figures with connections to Orpheus. An appendix contains an edition of the Derveni papyrus, a text discovered in 1962, which preserves a commentary (dating to around the end of the 5th century BC) on an Orphic poem.

PEG includes around 500 more Orphic fragments than the previous edition of this material, Otto Kern's 1922 Orphicorum fragmenta. Bernabé includes many fragments without explicit Orphic attribution, and often splits the text of longer passages across multiple fragments. In the section covering the theogonies, he attempts to arrange the fragments into a coherent reconstruction of each work's narrative, which in each case is presented as spanning from creation to the present state of the world. The second volume of PEG has been described as comprehensive and as superseding Kern's edition, although some scholars have questioned the way Bernabé contextualises the material.

== Volume I: Early Greek epic ==
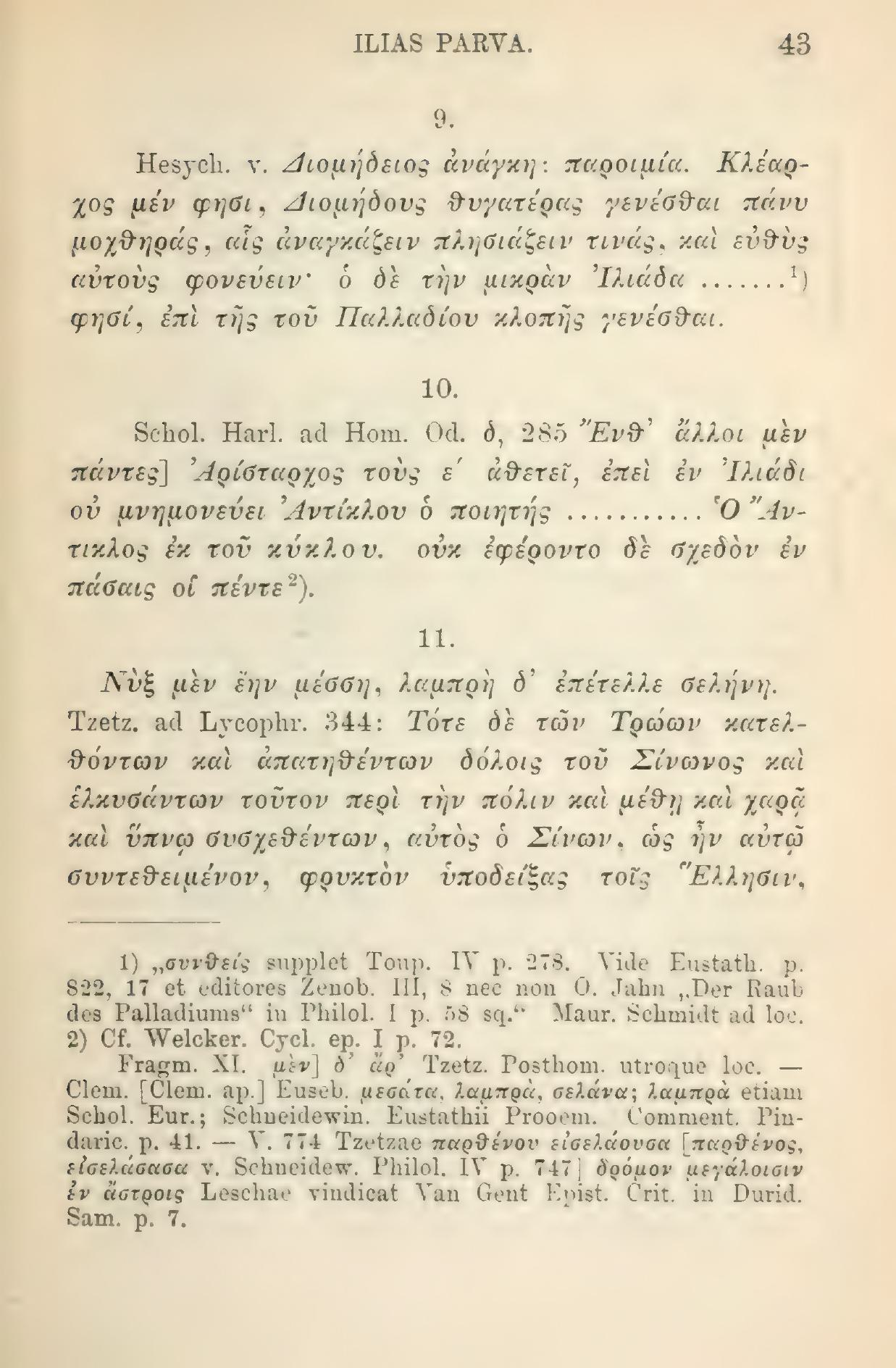
Page from Gottfried Kinkel's 1877 critical edition of the early Greek epic fragments, which was the most recent complete edition before Poetae Epici Graeci. Fragments from the Little Iliad are shown; below the Greek text of the fragments is the critical apparatus. (Note: For Kinkel's edition, see Kinkel. For this work as having been the most recent complete edition before PEG was published, see Davies 1989a, p. 4.)

The first volume of Poetae Epici Graeci ('Greek Epic Poets'; sometimes abbreviated as PEG) (Note: For example, it is abbreviated in this way by West 2006, p. 6.) was published in 1987, with a corrected second edition appearing in 1996. (Note: Betegh 2007, p. 259. For the 1996 version as a corrected edition, see the front matter of Bernabé 1996.) PEG was edited by Alberto Bernabé, a philologist at the Complutense University of Madrid, and is part of the Bibliotheca Teubneriana, (Note: For PEG as part of the Bibliotheca Teubneriana, see the front matter of Bernabé 1996, Bernabé 2004, Bernabé 2005, and Bernabé 2007.) a collection of critical editions of Greek and Latin texts. (Note: On the Bibliotheca Teubneriana, see Doer, p. 170.) Critical editions attempt to reconstruct an original text based on an analysis of its extant manuscripts; this reconstructed text is accompanied by a critical apparatus, which notes discrepancies between manuscripts. PEG's first volume is an edition of fragments – that is, passages from ancient writings that convey information from or about earlier, lost works – of early Greek epic poetry composed before and into the 5th century BC. (Note: Olson, n. 1 to para. 1. On the types of fragments in the edition, and their definitions, see this section's third paragraph.) Bernabé's prior works on this genre included a 1979 translation of fragments, as well as multiple articles. (Note: Labarbe 1990a, p. 266. For Bernabé's 1979 translation, see Bernabé 1979.)

The volume opens with a list of dialectal and metrical features of each text's fragments, followed by a 15-page bibliography. (Note: Labarbe 1990a, p. 267 ("observations on the dialect and prosody of each poem"); Davies 1989a, p. 4 ("collection of grammatical and metrical peculiarities"); Bernabé 1996, pp. ix–xxxiv. Labarbe gives the size of the bibliography.) The first fragments listed are those from the Epic Cycle, a collection of poems, at least most of which were composed during the 7th and 6th centuries BC. These poems were arranged so that, with the inclusion of the Iliad and Odyssey (which were composed before the poems of the Cycle, and are extant), a continuous narrative was formed. (Note: West 2003, p. 531. For the Iliad and Odyssey as having been written down before the other poems included in the Epic Cycle, and on the potential relation of the Epic Cycle's contents to the oral traditions from which the Iliad and Odyssey arose, see Davies 1989b, pp. 3–5.) Exactly which poems were part of the Epic Cycle is unclear; the works usually included are six poems about the Trojan War and three covering myths related to Thebes. (Note: Latacz, "A. Concept", para. 3. On the contents of these poems, see Brown, p. 584.) In addition to these, Bernabé presents fragments from poems less often included in the Cycle: a Theogony, a hypothesised work covering cosmogony; the Titanomachy, which narrated a war between two generations of gods; and the Alcmeonis, which centred on the mortal Alcmaeon. (Note: Willcock, p. 211. On these works as less often being thought of as part of the Cycle, see Latacz, "A. Concept", para. 3. On these works, see Tsagalis, p. 44 (Theogony), Davies 1989b, pp. 13–14 (Titanomachy), and Debiasi, p. 261 (Alcmeonis).) The remaining fragmentary authors and poems covered by the edition are presented in roughly chronological order, ending with the 5th-century BC poet Choerilus of Samos. (Note: Davies 1989a, p. 5. Davies writes that the order "seems intended" as chronological, a choice he criticises because these works can seldom be dated with exactness.) Among them are works about genealogy, astronomy, regional history, and the deeds of the hero Heracles. Bernabé omits the fragmentary works attributed to the 8th- or 7th-century BC poet Hesiod, which had been edited twenty years earlier by Reinhold Merkelbach and Martin Litchfield West. (Note: Labarbe 1990a, p. 267; Adrados, p. 172. For their edition, published in 1967, see Merkelbach & West. For these dates for Hesiod, see Schachter, p. 356.)

The edition contains fragments, which are passages that claim to record, via quotation or paraphrase, specific information contained in lost writings, and testimonia (sing.: 'testimonium'), which provide information about the authors or works themselves. Fragments are grouped according to whether Bernabé views their attribution to the earlier poem as authentic, uncertain, or spurious. Below the fragments, there are as many as three apparatuses: a list of the sources for the fragments, with surrounding lines often quoted; a collection of comparable passages from other works; and a critical apparatus infused with commentary and citations to modern scholarship.Labarbe 1990a, p. 267 At the end of the volume, an appendix by Ricardo Olmos Romera lists works of visual art pertinent to the study of the poems that the edition covers. Three indexes follow, as do tables outlining how Bernabé's numbering of the fragments differs from that of prior editors.

Before the publication of PEG's first volume, the most recent complete edition of fragmentary early Greek epic was Gottfried Kinkel's from 1877. Among Bernabé's advances over his predecessor are the systematic array of testimonia and comparable passages, as well as the inclusion of some new fragments. In 1988, an edition was published that covered the same genre, produced independently by Malcolm Davies. (Note: Willcock, p. 211. For Davies's edition as having been produced independently, see Labarbe 1990b, p. 268.) Whereas Bernabé's preface explains that he incorporates everything seemingly of epic provenance, Davies's, in his own words, "enunciates exactly the opposite principle". (Note: Davies 1989a, p. 8, quoting Bernabé 1987, pp. vii–viii.) Bernabé's edition is the more comprehensive of the two, with Davies providing a very laconic critical apparatus for the non-cyclic epics and omitting an apparatus containing comparable passages. Davies's edition is easier to use, according to Jules Labarbe, owing partly to its less crowded presentation. In his 1989 review of PEG's first volume, Davies criticises the choice of certain editions used to reconstruct the fragments, the handling of conjectures in the critical apparatus, and the inclusive attitude towards more dubious fragments, concluding that "unfavourable comment could be extended almost indefinitely". Another reviewer, Francisco Rodríguez Adrados, writes positively about the comprehensiveness of Bernabé's edition, and Labarbe, despite some criticisms, describes it as "certainly deserving of high praise".

== Volume II: Orphic literature ==
=== Background ===
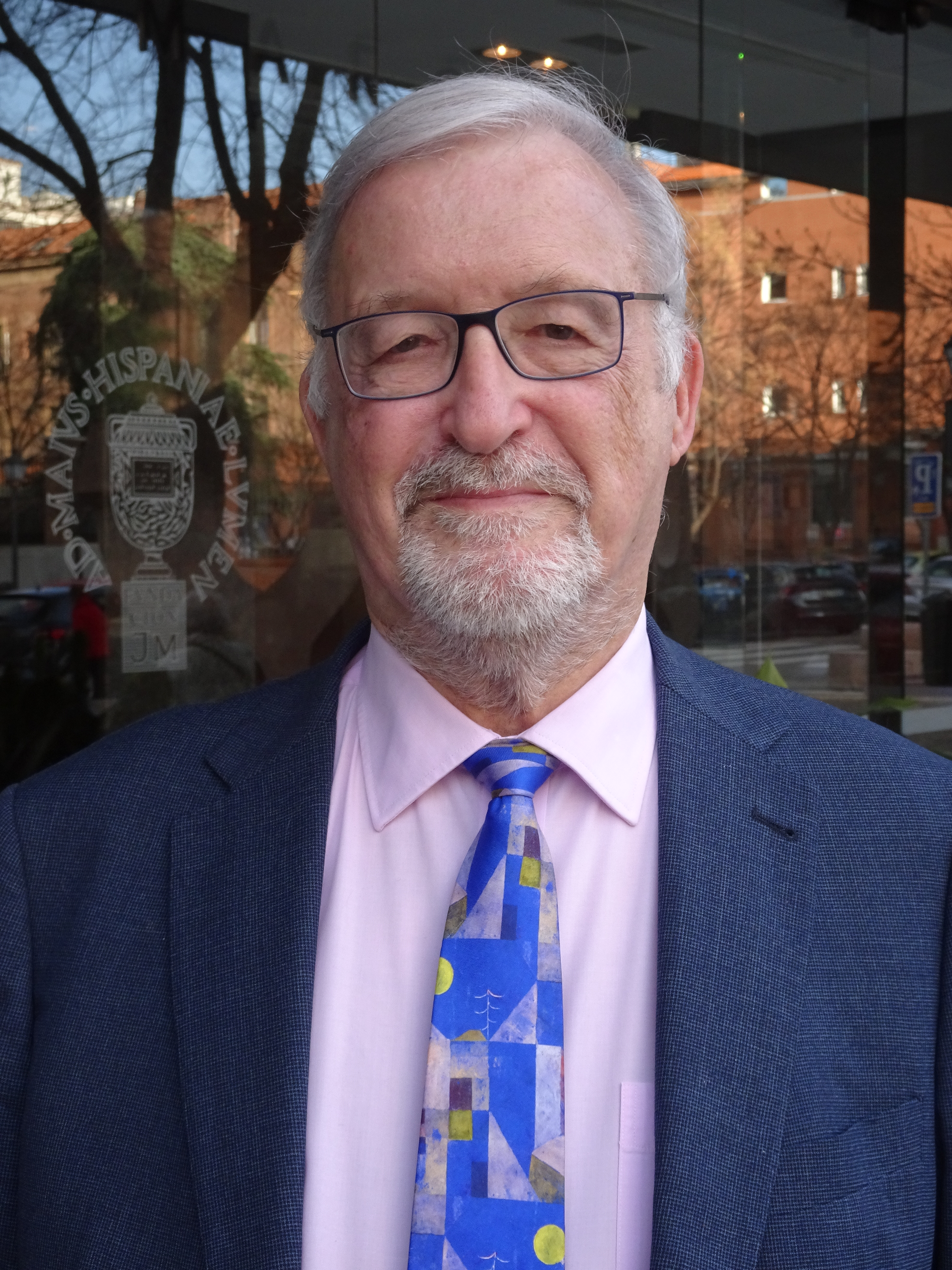
Alberto Bernabé, the editor of Poetae Epici Graeci, in 2024

The second volume of PEG is split across three fascicles (or instalments), published in 2004, 2005, and 2007. They cover the fragments of Orphic literature – the tradition of texts, most of which are lost, ascribed in antiquity to the mythical poet Orpheus – as well as comparable evidence. (Note: Edmonds 2004, para. 2. For this definition of Orphic literature, see Meisner, pp. 4–5.) For around two hundred years, Orphic literature has been part of the debate over what is known as "Orphism". Earlier scholars conceived of Orphism as a definable religious movement, which claimed Orpheus as its founder and held Orphic poems as its holy writings. Around the early 20th century, scholars of Orphism separated into two opposing strains of thought: "maximalists", or "PanOrphists", who viewed Orphism as a religious movement with shared beliefs; and "minimalists", or "Orpheosceptics", who repudiated the existence of a coherent Orphism. (Note: Edmonds 2011, pp. 7–8; Meisner, p. 6. The definition of maximalism is from Graf & Johnston, pp. 59–60, and that of minimalism is from Edmonds.) In 1922, Otto Kern published his Orphicorum fragmenta ('Fragments of the Orphics'), which remained the standard edition of the Orphic fragments until the publication of PEG. (Note: Roessli, p. 534. For Kern's edition, see Kern.) In the latter half of the 20th century, several discoveries impacted the study of Orphism: the Derveni papyrus, found in 1962, preserved a commentary (dating to around the end of the 5th century BC) on an earlier Orphic poem; there surfaced multiple inscribed gold tablets that were associated with the Dionysian Mysteries; and a handful of inscriptions on bone tablets from Olbia, published in 1978, seemingly connected Orphics with the god Dionysus and eschatology. (Note: Graf & Johnston, pp. 62–65. For this dating of the text preserved in the Derveni papyrus, see Kouremenos, Parássoglou & Tsantsanoglou, p. 10; for the papyrus's date of discovery, see Funghi, p. 25.)

Since the late 1980s, Bernabé has written extensively about Orphism. (Note: Chrysanthou, p. 5. For Bernabé's scholarship on the subject as going back to the late 1980s, see the bibliography of his works on Orphism up to 2011 in Herrero de Jáuregui et al., pp. xv–xxii.) He believes that Orphism possessed a central cluster of doctrines, relating to matters such as eschatology, anthropogony, and cosmogony. Bernabé is characterised as the "leading exponent of the new PanOrphist position" by Radcliffe Edmonds, a minimalist scholar whose approach Robert Parker characterises as "diametrically opposed" to Bernabé's. (Note: Parker 2014, para. 1. For Edmonds as an Orphic minimalist, see Meisner, p. 12.) In 2000, a chapter by Bernabé appeared in the volume Tra Orfeo e Pitagora ('Between Orpheus and Pythagoras'), in which he laid out the three projected fascicles of PEG's second volume, and explained aspects of the edition's approach. (Note: Edmonds 2004. For the chapter, see Bernabé 2000.) Bernabé's 2003 work, Hieros logos. Poesía órfica sobre los dioses, el alma y el más allá ('Hieros Logos: Orphic Poetry on the Gods, the Soul, and the Afterlife'), is a Spanish translation of some of the fragments in PEG. (Note: Morand, p. 223; Roessli, p. 535. For Bernabé's work, see Bernabé 2003.)

=== Contents ===
The fragments in Volume II are split across three parts: Part I, covering the fragments that pertain to Orphic texts, rites, and ritual practitioners, spans the first fascicle and some of the second; Part II, consisting of passages about Orpheus and related figures, occupies the remainder of the second fascicle; and Part III, comprising the fragments of authors similar to Orpheus, fills the third fascicle. (Note: Betegh 2007, p. 259. Betegh's review was written before the third fascicle had been published; for this information about Part III, see Bernabé 2007, pp. v–viii. Betegh also uses different nomenclature than this article: he calls the fascicles "volumes" and the volumes "parts".) The first fascicle opens with a bibliography that spans 72 pages and includes 31 sections, traversing every area of Orphism. (Note: Olson, para. 2; West 2006, p. 7; Bernabé 2004, pp. xii–lxxxiii. For the bibliography as spanning every area of Orphism, see Clay, p. 190.) It covers publications from the 19th century onwards, and includes numerous lesser-known works written in languages other than English. This first fascicle contains 469 fragments, the first 378 of which pertain to the Orphic theogonies, works concerned with the origins and genealogies of the gods. Scholars have typically inferred the existence of four main theogonies from the extant fragments: the Derveni Theogony, the work on which the Derveni papyrus comments; the Eudemian Theogony, from the 5th century BC; the Hieronyman Theogony, associated with writers called Hieronymus and Hellanicus; and the Rhapsodies, the largest theogony, which probably dates to between the 1st century BC and the 2nd century AD. (Note: Herrero de Jáuregui 2021, p. 502; Meisner, pp. 1, 161. The information about the individual theogonies is from Meisner.) Bernabé's edition covers the fragments he assigns to each of these theogonies; the Rhapsodies are allotted 270 fragments, which occupy over 200 pages. In the same part as the theogonies, Bernabé includes material from the Testament of Orpheus – a Jewish adaptation of an Orphic hieros logos ('sacred discourse'; pl.: hieroi logoi) – and from an Egyptian hieros logos. (Note: Jourdan, p. 803; Bernabé 2004, pp. 1–309. For these works as hieroi logoi, see Meisner, p. 111 (Testament of Orpheus) and Bernabé 2004, p. 55 (Egyptian poem). For this translation of hieros logos, see Tasseva, p. 445.) After the theogonic fragments, evidence relating to Orphic poems about the goddess Persephone and her mother Demeter is presented (frr. 379–402). Next come poems – such as the Net, Robe, and Lyre – which appear to have represented the world using the images of particular objects (frr. 403–420). (Note: Betegh 2007, p. 265; Bernabé 2004, pp. 336–348. For this numbering of the fragments, see Bernabé's edition.) The final section of the first fascicle covers passages about the soul's nature and destiny that may bear relation to Orphism (frr. 421–469), including the inscriptions on the Olbian bone tablets.

At the beginning of the second fascicle, there is an addendum containing an additional 14 pages of bibliography. (Note: Betegh 2007, p. 260; Bernabé 2005, pp. xi–xxv. For this addendum's placement at the front, see Bernabé's edition.) The first fragments listed are those pertaining to Orphic rites (frr. 470–679); this is where Bernabé places the gold tablets, which he had previously edited in 2001. (Note: Roessli, pp. 535–536; Bernabé 2005, pp. 1–243. For the gold tablets in particular, see Bernabé 2005, pp. 9–79; for the 2001 edition of these works, see Bernabé & Jiménez San Cristóbal 2001.) Also included here is material about taboos, about rites designed to allow the soul to become blessed, and about Orphics and Orphic connections with different religious movements and cults. The next sections of the fascicle contain fragments from hymns and epigrams attributed to Orpheus (frr. 680–705); from Orphic texts describing a katabasis, a journey into the underworld (frr. 707–717); from poems associated with Orpheus about topics such as astrology, medicine, and agriculture (frr. 718–803); from Orphic divinatory works (frr. 804–811); from Orphic texts pertaining to magic (frr. 812–834); and from miscellaneous Orphic works (frr. 835–863). (Note: Betegh 2007, p. 262 n. 3; Bernabé 2005, pp. 244–261 (hymns and epigrams), 262–287 (texts describing a katabasis), 288–338 (poems about astrology, etc.), 339–342 (divinatory works), 343–366 (magical texts), 367–382 (miscellaneous works). For these fragment numberings, see Bernabé 2005, pp. v–vii.) This marks the end of Part I of Volume II, and the remainder of the fascicle covers testimonia relating to Orpheus (frr. 864–1095), and to figures who, in antiquity, were thought to have been his pupils or were associated with Orphic writings (frr. 1096–1151). (Note: Roessli, p. 536; Bernabé 2005, pp. 383–518 (Orpheus), 519–553 (related figures, split across four sections). On Part I as ending here, see Betegh 2007, p. 262 n. 3.)

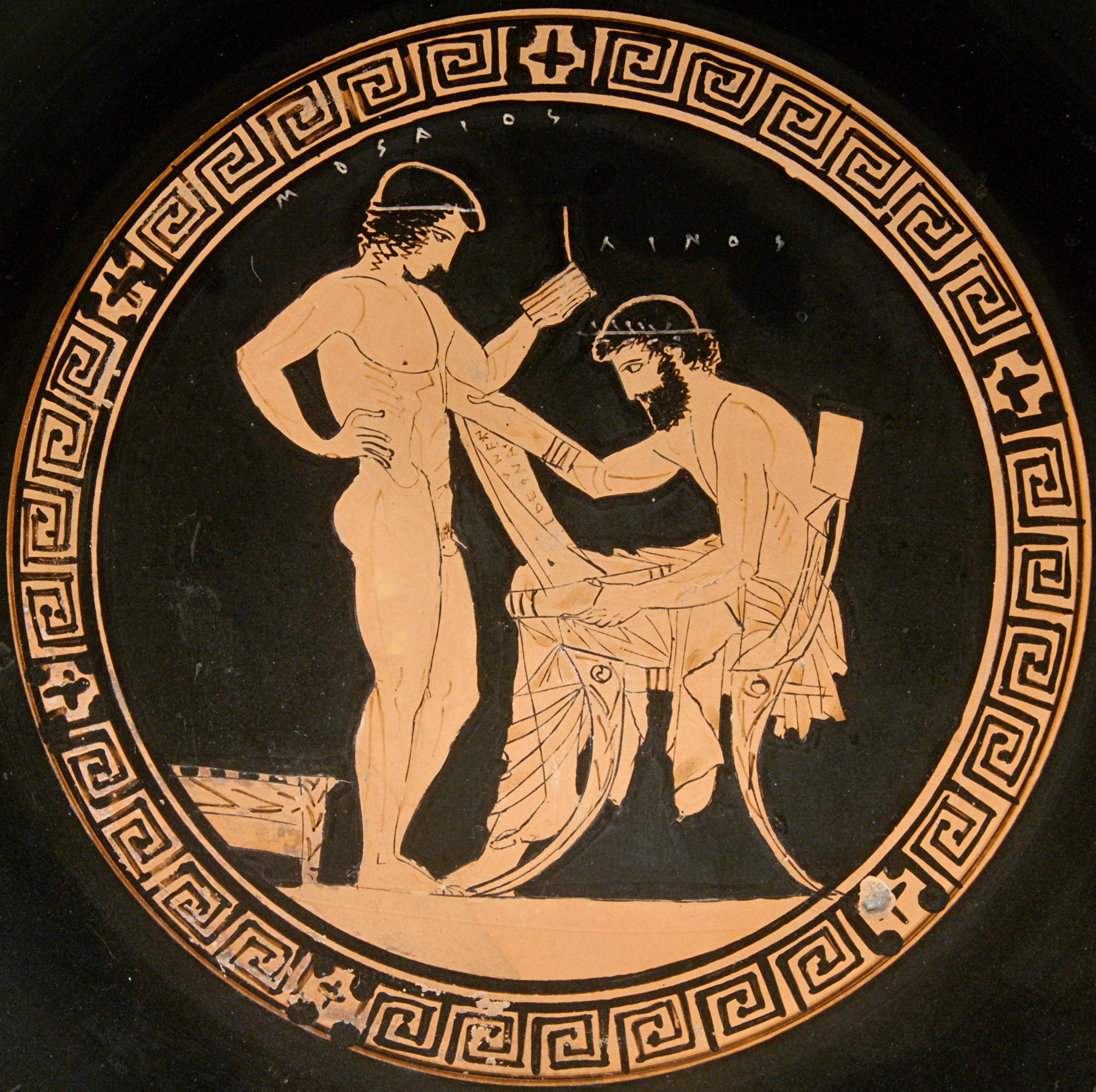
Musaeus (left) and Linus (right), two mythical poets whose fragments are collected in Poetae Epici Graeci, Volume II, Fascicle 3, depicted on an Attic red-figure cup, c. 430–420 BC (Note: Boardman, p. 290; Louvre G 457. The date used here is that from Boardman.)

The third fascicle covers the fragments and testimonia of three figures with links to Orpheus: Musaeus, a mythical poet, associated with the Muses and often described as Orpheus's pupil; Linus, a mythical musician, sometimes considered a son of the god Apollo; and Epimenides, a semi-mythical religious man from Crete, about whom miraculous tales were told. (Note: For the edition as containing the fragments of these poets, see Warga, p. 340. For this information about these poets, see Heinze, para. 1–2, 4, 6 (Musaeus), Rose & Krummen, p. 868 (Linus), and Parker 2004, para. 1 (Epimenides); for Epimenides as semi-mythical, see Oikonomaki, para. 1. The poetry ascribed to Epimenides was pseudepigraphic (Parker 2004, para. 2).) An appendix contains a complete critical edition of the Derveni papyrus; this text had only received its first full edition a year prior, by Theokritos Kouremenos, George Parássoglou, and Kyriakos Tsantsanoglou, (Note: Betegh 2018, para. 2. For this earlier edition, see Kouremenos, Parássoglou & Tsantsanoglou.) and Bernabé makes use of their version as well as earlier partial editions. (Note: Warga, p. 341. For Bernabé's edition as using that by Kouremenos, Parássoglou, and Tsantsanoglou, see Bernabé 2007, pp. 171 ff.) After this, there are four indexes covering the whole of Volume II, (Note: Warga, p. 340; Bernabé 2007, pp. 271–376.) and tables detailing how Bernabé's numbering of the Orphic fragments – as well as the fragments of Musaeus, Linus, and Epimenides – differs from prior editions. (Note: See the tables in Bernabé's edition: Bernabé 2007, pp. 377–442.) Also included is a list of additions and corrections to the two previous fascicles.

Each passage included in the edition of the Orphic fragments is accompanied by a letter: F, T, or V. The first two of these designate fragments and testimonia, respectively, and the third denotes vestigia (sing.: vestigium), passages that appear to contain signs of Orphic influence. By employing two different font sizes, Bernabé discriminates between literary fragments, which are preserved lines of an Orphic text, and indirect fragments, which convey information from an Orphic source without directly quoting it. Literary fragments are accompanied by three levels of apparatus: a collection of the sources through which the preserved lines are known, with surrounding context quoted; an assortment of passages (from other works) which use similar language; and a combination of a critical apparatus, a presentation of modern scholarly interpretations, a bibliography, and comments by Bernabé himself. Literary fragments of Musaeus, Linus, and Epimenides are also accompanied by these three layers of apparatus. (Note: Warga, p. 340. Warga does not specify that the three apparatuses are present only for literary fragments. This can be verified by observing the fragments with different font sizes in Bernabé's edition; for example, compare the apparatuses under Musaeus frr. 74–75 on Bernabé 2007, p. 36. The edition of the Derveni papyrus includes the apparatus of parallel passages and that containing the critical notes and commentary.) These apparatuses occupy a large amount of room; for example, the first Orphic fragment, the text of which comprises two lines, has apparatuses that span six pages, dwelling beneath Bernabé's introduction to the Derveni Theogony.

=== Approach ===
Whereas Kern's edition positioned the testimonia before the fragments, Bernabé for the most part inverts this order. This arrangement reflects where modern scholarly interest has lain: on Orphic material rather than on Orpheus himself. (Note: Betegh 2007, p. 261; Roessli, p. 534. Betegh and Edmonds 2004 (the latter of whom is commenting after only the first fascicle had been published) note that Bernabé includes some testimonia amongst the fragments. As Betegh comments, the exception to Kern's placement of the testimonia before the fragments is that prose testimonia about Orphic poems are included in the section covering the fragments. Kern's edition does not include vestigia (Morand, p. 223).) A total of 1151 Orphic fragments, testimonia, and vestigia are collected in PEG, (Note: See the end of the table in the third fascicle: Bernabé 2007, p. 415. The fragments of Musaeus, Linus, and Epimenides are each numbered separately to the Orphic fragments; see Bernabé 2007, pp. v–vii.) compared to the 363 fragments and 262 testimonia presented by Kern. While this increase is partly a result of new discoveries, Bernabé includes numerous fragments without explicit Orphic attribution that Kern did not. He also elides certain passages that are present in Kern's edition; he repudiates, for example, his predecessor's belief that there is an allusion to an Orphic work about Demeter in a passage from the playwright Euripides's Helen. Similarly to Kern, the three works of Orphic literature that survive in full – the Hymns, Argonautica, and Lithica – are excluded by Bernabé.

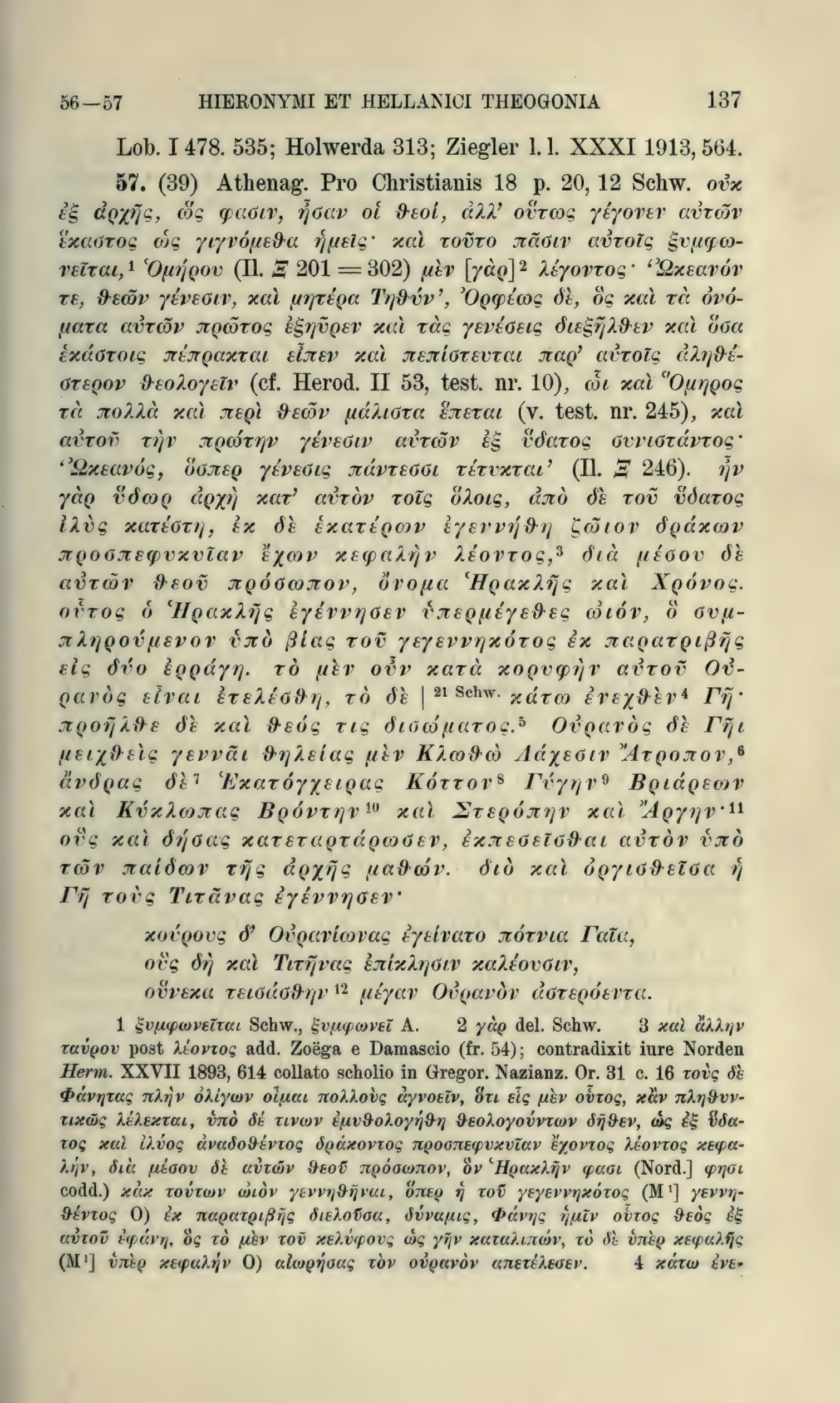
Fragment 57 in Otto Kern's Orphicorum fragmenta. from Athenagoras's Legatio Pro Christianis. Bernabé distributes this passage across eight fragments.

Bernabé's approach to the inclusion of fragments reflects his conception of Orphism. Fragments that bear no explicit Orphic ascription can be included on the grounds that they possess certain doctrines. The surviving lines from Orphic sources are presented on their own, with the surrounding context from the writings that transmit them housed in the apparatus. He restricts how much of this context is provided, stripping away interpretative material that, in his view, accumulated around original elements of Orphic myths. This contrasts with the lengthy passages of source material that are included in Kern's edition; in his 2000 chapter outlining the forthcoming edition, Bernabé described the quantity of Neoplatonic interpretation Kern left in as excessive. (Note: Bernabé 2000, p. 74. Texts by Neoplatonist philosophers are among the late antique sources for the Orphic theogonies.(Parker 1995, p. 488).) Whereas a whole excerpt is allotted a single fragment in Kern's edition, Bernabé frequently partitions longer passages, distributing the text across multiple fragments. (Note: West 2006, p. 6. For a complete list of how Bernabé splits up the fragments in Kern's edition, see the table in Bernabé 2007, pp. 416–425.) Broken-up segments that pertain to the theogonies are arranged according to where Bernabé believes they fall within each poem's narrative. (Note: Edmonds 2004, para. 18; similarly, see Meisner, p. 127 and Betegh 2007, p. 263, who are commenting on the fragments of the Hieronyman Theogony.) In some cases, Bernabé attempts to reconstruct lines of an Orphic source using paraphrases in Neoplatonic writings.

In the part of the edition covering the theogonies, Bernabé tries to discern the Orphic works belonging to this genre that existed in antiquity, and orders them chronologically. He attempts to arrange the fragments of each theogony into a coherent reconstruction of the poem's narrative; these reconstructions present each work as stretching from creation to the current order of the world, similarly to the Theogony of Hesiod. In the section's introduction, he rejects the idea that Orphic theogonies can be fitted into a stemma, which was the approach taken by West in his 1983 monograph, The Orphic Poems. (Note: Graf 2026, pp. 39 n. 1, 51; Bernabé 2004, p. 1. For West's book, see West 1983.) Bernabé's ordering of the fragments and his assignment of them to discrete theogonies, however, show the influence of West's book. The subtitle of Bernabé's section covering the theogonic fragments is "Hieroi Logoi", which characterises the theogonies as essentially the same as Orphic sacred texts.

The section covering the Derveni Theogony brings together the lines of the poem that the Derveni papyrus quotes, with the ancient commentary mostly restricted to the apparatus. (Note: Jourdan, pp. 804–805. Jourdan notes that fr. 3, for example, is entirely Bernabé's reconstruction of the poem's lines, based on a paraphrase in the papyrus.) Among the fragments of the Eudemian Theogony, Bernabé includes a passage from the Timaeus – a dialogue by Plato composed in the mid-4th century BC – which describes a genealogy of the gods spanning five generations. (Note: Betegh 2007, pp. 262–263. On the genealogy, see Meisner, p. 98. The passage is Plato, Timaeus 40e–41a (Zeyl, pp. 27–28) [= Orphic frr. 21, 24 Bernabé (2007, pp. 36, 39)].) This passage has been used by some scholars, including West, to reconstruct an assumed six-generation progression within the Eudemian Theogony. Following the fragments he assigns to this theogony, Bernabé lists early passages that may be evidence for the story of Dionysus's dismemberment. This myth describes how the Titans (the gods from the generation before Zeus) rent apart Dionysus during his childhood, and how he was reborn; it has often been regarded as central to Orphic thought. Bernabé splits up the accounts of the two main sources for the Hieronyman Theogony – the 6th-century AD Neoplatonist philosopher Damascius and the 2nd-century AD Christian apologist Athenagoras – and rearranges pieces of Athenagoras's text so as to accord with Damascius's version, presenting the theogony as a single lengthy narrative.

Like most scholars, Bernabé believes that the Rhapsodies were a continuous narrative; he collects a handful of passages (frr. 96–100) which he views as evidence that the work consisted of a single story. In contrast, Edmonds considers the Rhapsodies to have been a loose compilation of Orphic texts, comparable in form to the Sibylline Oracles, a collection comprising oracular texts of varied origins and dates. Bernabé's reconstruction of the work's narrative spans from creation to the genesis of mankind, progressing through six divine reigns in consecutive generations. Chronos, the personification of time, is unambiguously called the poem's earliest deity by Damascius, although other fragments seemingly intimate that Chronos was preceded by primordial matter. Bernabé interprets this primordial matter as Night (a primeval goddess in earlier Orphic theogonies), pointing to late sources that seemingly describe her as coming first in the poem. (Note: Betegh 2007, p. 264. Specifically, he believes this to be the first of three Nights that appeared in the poem; on this, and on the late sources about Night, see Meisner, pp. 178, 182, 205–206. On the issue of the three Nights in the Rhapsodies, see Nyx § Rhapsodies.) Also contained in the section on the Rhapsodies are most of the fragments that Bernabé sees as pertaining to the myth of Dionysus's dismemberment (frr. 296–331). (Note: Chrysanthou, p. 85 n. 262; Bernabé 2004, pp. 243–273. As noted above, Bernabé includes possible early evidence for the myth after the fragments of the Eudemian Theogony. He also collects fragments that he views as related to an alternative version of the myth (frr. 57–59) in his section on the Egyptian hieros logos and other evidence related to Egypt; see Bernabé 2004, pp. 64–68.) According to his ordering of the fragments, this myth fell at the end of the poem: Dionysus was killed by the Titans, there was the emergence of humanity, and the god was reborn. Bernabé also approaches passages from the Homilies and Recognitions, two texts probably composed in 4th-century AD Syria, as drawing upon the Rhapsodies, rather than upon a separate Orphic theogony. (Note: Roessli, p. 535; Betegh 2007, p. 264. On the Homilies and Recognitions, see Fusillo, paras. 1–2.)

Bernabé's edition treats the Testament of Orpheus as having two versions, fewer than some earlier scholars had recognised. (Note: Betegh 2007, p. 265. Bernabé's fr. 377 is the first of these versions, and fr. 378 the second (Bernabé 2004, pp. 299–309).) Four Orphic works about Persephone and Demeter were discerned in Kern's edition, two of which Bernabé does not accept. Bernabé also includes a new source – a passage from the Derveni papyrus – and disperses evidence from Berlin Papyrus 13044, which preserves an Orphic account of Persephone's abduction myth, across seven fragments. (Note: Betegh 2007, p. 265. For this information about Berlin Papyrus 13044, see Currie, pp. 80–81.) His section covering evidence about the soul includes passages that have no explicit Orphic attribution, with only 16 of a total 49 being labelled as "F" fragments; he makes no attempt to assign the passages in this section to specific sources. (Note: Edmonds 2004, para. 6. For 16 of the passages in this section as being "F" fragments, see Betegh 2007, p. 266; as noted in § Contents, the section includes 49 fragments.) The texts from the gold tablets, regardless of their provenance, are ordered according to where they fall in the journey of the soul after death which Bernabé perceives in their contents. (Note: Bowden, p. 205, commenting on the edition of the tablets in Bernabé & Jiménez San Cristóbal 2008. As Bowden states, Bernabé and Jiménez San Cristóbal order the texts identically to Bernabé's Poetae Epici Graeci.)

=== Reception ===
At the time of its publication, multiple reviewers commented that Bernabé's edition of the Orphic fragments would supersede that by Kern. Gábor Betegh writes that the work is "not merely a presentation of the material", but rather a "crucially important contribution" to the Orphic debate, owing to the choices Bernabé makes about the inclusion and arrangement of fragments. Edmonds describes Bernabé's edition as "superior to [Kern's] in almost every way", the only exception being his provision of comparatively little context from the writings that transmit the fragments. Dwayne Meisner, in his 2018 book about the Orphic theogonies, states that Bernabé's proclivity for splitting the fragments of the Hieronyman Theogony conceals information about why the authors transmitting them "are talking about an Orphic theogony in the first place". (Note: Meisner, pp. 127, 139. On p. 160, he makes a similar comment about Bernabé's approach to the fragments of the Rhapsodies.) Edmonds also takes issue with Bernabé's approach to the inclusion of fragments, arguing that he treats any material reminiscent of the doctrines he considers central to Orphism as "fair game for inclusion". (Note: Edmonds 2013, pp. 64–65. As an example of this doctrinal approach, Edmonds points to the relative paucity of material included about Demeter compared to Dionysus; the latter features in a myth thought to be key to Orphic doctrines.)

Jean-Michel Roessli writes that "Bernabé's knowledge of the scholarship on [Orphism] is so vast that it is evident on almost every page of this edition". He also notes that this exhaustiveness encumbers the apparatuses, rendering them difficult to consult. Edmonds comments that the apparatuses deliver "a wealth of scholarly information to those who can apprehend their mysteries", and West opines that it would have been preferable to place the text of the fragments in a separate tome from the commentary. S. Douglas Olson describes the edition's layout as complex and cumbersome, and criticises the number of typographical errors and citation mistakes, requesting that a "fully revised and corrected second edition" be issued. After the publication of the third fascicle, Richard G. Warga commented that PEG would become the standard edition of the fragments of Musaeus, Linus, and Epimenides.

In 2011, Tracing Orpheus: Studies of Orphic Fragments, an edited volume comprising studies of particular Orphic fragments, was published in celebration of PEG. (Note: Chrysanthou, p. 5 (contents of volume); Roessli, p. 537 (celebrating PEG). For the volume, see Herrero de Jáuregui et al.)

== Bibliographic information ==
- Bernabé, Alberto (1987), Poetarum Epicorum Graecorum Testimonia et Fragmenta. Pars I, Bibliotheca Teubneriana, Leipzig, B. G. Teubner, 1987. ISBN 3322003523. Internet Archive. This is the 1st edition of Bernabé 1996.
- Bernabé, Alberto (1996), Poetarum Epicorum Graecorum Testimonia et Fragmenta. Pars I, Bibliotheca Teubneriana, Stuttgart and Leipzig, B. G. Teubner, 1996. ISBN 3815417066. doi:10.1515/9783110936995. This is the 2nd edition of Bernabé 1987.
- Bernabé, Alberto (2004), Poetae Epici Graeci: Testimonia et Fragmenta. Pars II: Orphicorum et Orphicis Similium Testimonia et Fragmenta. Fasciculus 1, Bibliotheca Teubneriana, Munich and Leipzig, K. G. Saur, 2004. ISBN 3598717075. doi:10.1515/9783110943702.
- Bernabé, Alberto (2005), Poetae Epici Graeci: Testimonia et Fragmenta. Pars II: Orphicorum et Orphicis Similium Testimonia et Fragmenta. Fasciculus 2, Bibliotheca Teubneriana, Munich and Leipzig, K. G. Saur, 2005. ISBN 3598717083. doi:10.1515/9783110918915.
- Bernabé, Alberto (2007), Poetae Epici Graeci: Testimonia et Fragmenta. Pars II: Musaeus. Linus. Epimenides. Papyrus Derveni. Indices. Fasciculus 3, Bibliotheca Teubneriana, Berlin, De Gruyter, 2007. ISBN 9783110194876. doi:10.1515/9783110926392.
