= Elizabeth Jeffreys =

British Byzantine scholar (1941–2023)

Elizabeth Jeffreys FAHA
- Born: 22 July 1941
- Died: 12 September 2023 (aged 82)

Academic background
- Education: Girton College, Cambridge; St Anne's College, Oxford

Academic work
- Institutions: University of Oxford
- Main interests: Byzantine and modern Greek language and literature
- Notable works: Digenis Akritis: The Grottaferrata and Escorial Versions

Elizabeth Mary Jeffreys FAHA (née Brown, 22 July 1941 – 12 September 2023) was a British scholar of Byzantium. She was Bywater and Sotheby Professor of Byzantine and Modern Greek Language and Literature, University of Oxford, and a Professorial Fellow of Exeter College, Oxford, 1996–2006.

== Life and career ==
Elizabeth Mary Brown was born on 22 July 1941 to Lawrence Brown and Veronica (née Thompson). She was educated at Blackheath High School and Girton College, Cambridge, where she took an undergraduate degree in classics. In 1963 she came to Oxford to study for a Bachelor of Letters (BLitt) in medieval Greek and French at St Anne's College, which she earned with a thesis on fourteenth-century romances. At Oxford she took classes in modern Greek with Robin Fletcher.

Jeffreys taught Classics at Mary Datchelor School in London from 1965, then took up a senior resident fellowship at the Warburg Institute, University of London, in 1969. At Warburg she attended the seminars of Ernst Gombrich whom she cited as a formative influence. She spent 1972–74 at the Dumbarton Oaks Center for Byzantine Studies in Washington, DC, where her husband Michael and then herself were visiting fellows for a year each, and where she participated in Cyril Mango's seminar before his establishment in Oxford. In 1974 Elizabeth and Michael Jeffreys received appointments as research fellows at the University of Ioannina in Greece. The couple moved to Australia in 1976 where Elizabeth Jeffreys held research fellowships at the Australian National University in Canberra (1978–79), University of Melbourne (1987–89) and the University of Sydney (1991–95), while teaching at Macquarie University and the University of Sydney. Jeffreys and her husband were among the four founding members of the Australian (now Australasian) Association for Byzantine Studies in 1978 and played a key role in developing the discipline of Byzantine studies in Australia. She was briefly at Dumbarton Oaks again as a Fellow in 1983–84.

In 1996 Jeffreys was appointed to the chair in Byzantine and Modern Greek Language and Literature at Oxford, as the successor to Cyril Mango, and returned to the United Kingdom. She served as Sub-Rector of Exeter College in 1997–99, when the literary critic Marilyn Butler was Rector. In 2006 she and Anthony Bryer convened the 21st International Congress of Byzantine Studies in London. She retired that year and remained in Oxford as Bywater and Sotheby Professor of Byzantine and Modern Greek Language and Literature Emerita and Emerita Fellow of Exeter College. She held a Leverhulme Emeritus Fellowship in 2008–09 and continued to work on the first edition of the twelfth-century Byzantine court poetry conventionally attributed to Manganeios Prodromos.

Jeffreys was elected a Fellow of the Australian Academy of the Humanities (1993) and an Honorary Fellow of St Anne's College, Oxford.

Elizabeth Jeffreys died from complications of a stroke on 12 September 2023, at the age of 82.

== Books ==
=== Authored ===
- Popular Literature in Late Byzantium (with Michael Jeffreys), London: Variorum Reprints, 1983. ISBN 0-86078-118-6
- The Age of the Dromon: The Byzantine Navy ca 500–1204 (with John Pryor), Leiden: Brill, 2006. ISBN 90-04-15197-4

=== Source editions and translations ===
- The Chronicle of John Malalas (tr. with Michael Jeffreys and Roger Scott), Melbourne: Australian Association for Byzantine Studies, 1986. ISBN 0-9593626-2-2
- Benoît de Sainte-Maure, ̔Ο Πόλεμος τῆς Τρωάδος (The War of Troy) (ed. with Manolis Papathomopoulos), Athens: National Bank of Greece Cultural Foundation, 1996. Editio princeps of the Roman de Troie. ISBN 960-250-118-9
- Digenis Akritis: The Grottaferrata and Escorial Versions (ed. and tr.), Cambridge: Cambridge University Press, 1998. ISBN 0-521-39472-4
- Iacobi Monachi Epistulae (ed. with Michael Jeffreys), Turnhout: Brepols, 2009. ISBN 2-503-40681-5
- Four Byzantine Novels: Theodore Prodromos, "Rhodanthe and Dosikles"; Eumathios Makrembolites, "Hysmine and Hysminias"; Constantine Manasses, "Aristandros and Kallithea"; Niketas Eugenianos, "Drosilla and Charikles" (tr.), Liverpool: Liverpool University Press, 2012. ISBN 1-84631-825-4

=== Edited ===
- Byzantine Papers: Proceedings of the First Australian Byzantine Studies Conference, Canberra, 17–19 May 1978 (with Michael Jeffreys and Ann Moffatt), Canberra: Australian National University, 1981. ISBN 0-86784-009-9
- Studies in John Malalas (with Brian Croke and Roger Scott), Sydney: Australian Association for Byzantine Studies, 1990. ISBN 0-9593626-5-7
- The Sixth Century: End or Beginning? (with Pauline Allen), Brisbane: Australian Association of Byzantine Studies, 1996. ISBN 1-86420-074-X
- Through the Looking Glass: Byzantium through British Eyes: Papers from the Twenty-Ninth Spring Symposium of Byzantine Studies, London, March 1995 (with Robin Cormack), Aldershot: Ashgate, 2000. ISBN 0-86078-667-6
- Rhetoric in Byzantium: Papers from the Thirty-Fifth Spring Symposium of Byzantine Studies, Exeter College, Oxford, March 2001, Aldershot: Ashgate, 2003. ISBN 0-7546-3453-1
- Approaches to Texts in Early Modern Greek: Anadromika kai prodromika: Papers from the Conference Neograeca Medii Aevi V, Exeter College, University of Oxford, September 2000 (with Michael Jeffreys), Oxford: Sub-Faculty of Modern Greek, 2005. ISBN 0955018307
- Byzantine Style, Religion, and Civilisation: In Honour of Sir Steven Runciman, Cambridge: Cambridge University Press, 2006. ISBN 0-521-83445-7
- Oxford Handbook of Byzantine Studies, with Robin Cormack and John Haldon, Oxford University Press, 2008. ISBN 0-19-925246-7
- Shipping, Trade and Crusade in the Medieval Mediterranean: Studies in Honour of John Pryor (with Ruthy Gertwagen), Farnham: Ashgate, 2012. ISBN 9781409437536

== Bibliography ==
- Moffatt, Ann (2011b), "Publications of Michael John Jeffreys and Elizabeth Mary Jeffreys", in Nathan, Geoffrey; Garland, Lynda (eds.), Basileia: Essays on Imperium and Culture: In Honour of E.M. Jeffreys and M.J. Jeffreys, Brisbane: Australian Association for Byzantine Studies, pp. 5–13, ISBN 9781876503307, archived from the original on 16 September 2023
