= Garzya =

Garzya is a surname. Notable people with the surname include:

- Antonio Garzya (1927–2012), Italian classical scholar and philologist
- Luigi Garzya (born 1969), Italian footballer
