= Roger D. Dawe =

British classical scholar (1934–2020)

Roger David Dawe
- Born: September 15, 1934; Bristol
- Died: February 16, 2020 (aged 85); Cognac
- Occupation: Classical scholar
- Awards: Porson Prize (1955, 1956)

Academic background
- Education: Caius College, Cambridge
- Doctoral advisor: D. L. Page
- Other advisor: H. Lloyd-Jones

Academic work
- Discipline: Classical philology
- Institutions: Trinity College, Cambridge

Roger David Dawe (15 September 1934 – 16 February 2020) was a British classical scholar, Fellow of Trinity College, Cambridge.

== Biography ==
Born in Bristol, educated at Clifton College and at Caius College, from where he graduated with Firsts in the Classical Tripos and was twice recipient of the Porson Prize. His Ph.D. tutor was Sir Denys Page, under whom he defended a thesis on the manuscript transmission of Aeschylus in 1961; Sir Hugh Lloyd-Jones sat in the examining commission.

Dawe was made a Fellow of Caius College in 1957, moving to Trinity College in 1963 where he was Teaching Fellow (1963–1998) and Senior Research Fellow (1998–2001).

His wife, Kerstin Marianne Wallner (d. 2000), was Swedish. The Dawes resided in Bulstrode Gardens, Cambridge. He was fond of gardening, opera and tennis.

== Research Activity ==
Dawe researched the textual transmission of ancient Greek playwriters, with special interest for Aeschylus and Sophocles. His first monographs were a study of the manuscript transmission of Aeschylus' plays, which firmed the grounds for Denys Page's Oxford edition, and a repertoire of conjectures on Aeschylus.

He went on to investigate the transmission of Sophocles' plays, publishing a three-volume research companion on the text and transmission of Sophocles and the Teubner edition of all the seven plays. Dawe's Teubner Sophocles received a second, revised edition and each play also appeared in third-edition, separate volumes. The Oedipus the King was also edited for the "Cambridge Greek and Latin Classics" series. His Sophoclean scholarship was praised by Lloyd-Jones, who would later also edit Sophocles.

Outside Greek plays, Dawe published a translation with commentary of Homer's Odyssey and he edited the Teubner text of the Philogelos — a late-antique collection of jokes. Dawe, with James Diggle, was also responsible for revising and preparing for publication Page's posthumous edition and commentary of Greek epigrams; with Diggle and Pat Easterling, Dawe also edited a Festschrift to honor of Page's seventieth birthday.

== Publications ==
The complete list of publications was collected by P. J. Finglass after Dawe's death.

- Dawe, R. D. (1964). The Collation and Investigation of Manuscripts of Aeschylus. Cambridge: University Press.
- Dawe, R. D. (1965). Repertory of Conjectures on Aeschylus. Leiden: Brill.
- Dawe, R. D. (1973). Studies in the Text of Sophocles. Vol. I–II. Leiden: Brill.
- Dawe, R. D. (1978). Studies in the Text of Sophocles. Vol. III. Leiden: Brill.
- Dawe, R. D. (2007). Boschetti, F.; Citti, V. (eds.). Corruption and Correction: A Collection of Articles. Lexis, Suppl. 44. Amsterdam: Hakkert.
- Dawe, R. D., ed. (2000). Philogelos. München – Leipzig: K. G. Saur.
- Dawe, R. D.; Diggle, J.; Easterling, P. E., eds. (1978). Dionysiaca. Nine Studies in Greek Poetry by Former Pupils Presented to Sir Denys Page on his Seventieth Birthday. Cambridge: The Editors.
- Page, D. L., ed. (1981). Further Greek Epigrams. Revised by R. D. Dawe and J. Diggle. Cambridge: University Press.
- Sophocles (1974). Dawe, R. D. (ed.). Tragoediae. Vol. I. Leipzig: Teubner.
- Sophocles (1979). Dawe, R. D. (ed.). Tragoediae. Vol. II. Leipzig: Teubner.
- Sophocles (1984). Dawe, R. D. (ed.). Tragoediae. Vol. I (2nd ed.). Leipzig: Teubner.
- Sophocles (1985). Dawe, R. D. (ed.). Tragoediae. Vol. II (2nd ed.). Leipzig: Teubner.
- Sophocles (1982). Dawe, R. D. (ed.). Oedipus Rex. Cambridge: University Press.
- Sophocles (1996a). Dawe, R. D. (ed.). Aiax (3rd ed.). Stuttgart – Leipzig: Teubner.
- Sophocles (1996b). Dawe, R. D. (ed.). Electra (3rd ed.). Stuttgart – Leipzig: Teubner.
- Sophocles (1996c). Dawe, R. D. (ed.). Oedipus Rex (3rd ed.). Stuttgart – Leipzig: Teubner.
- Sophocles (1996d). Dawe, R. D. (ed.). Antigone (3rd ed.). Stuttgart – Leipzig: Teubner.
- Sophocles (1996e). Dawe, R. D. (ed.). Trachiniae (3rd ed.). Stuttgart – Leipzig: Teubner.
- Sophocles (1996f). Dawe, R. D. (ed.). Philoctetes (3rd ed.). Stuttgart – Leipzig: Teubner.
- Sophocles (1996g). Dawe, R. D. (ed.). Oedipus Coloneus (3rd ed.). Stuttgart – Leipzig: Teubner.
- Sophocles (2006). Dawe, R. D. (ed.). Oedipus Rex (2nd ed.). Cambridge: University Press.

== Trivia ==
- At Bristol, Dawe resided in Beaconsfield Road, where also Cary Grant grew up.

== Bibliography ==
- Dawe, R. D. (1969). "A Reply from Dr Dawe". Proceedings of the Cambridge Philological Society. N. S. 15 (195): 109. JSTOR 44696841.
- Finglass, P. J. (2020a). "R. D. Dawe: Academic Publications 1959-2020". Lexis. 38 (2): 345–350. doi:10.30687/Lexis/2724-1564/2020/02/003.
- Finglass, P. J. (2020b). "Roger Dawe and the Text of Greek Tragedy". Lexis. 38 (2): 351–357. doi:10.30687/Lexis/2724-1564/2020/02/004.
- Gow, A. S. F.; Page, D. L., eds. (1964). Hellenistic Epigrams. The Greek Anthology, 1. Vol. I–II. Cambridge: University Press.
- Gow, A. S. F.; Page, D. L., eds. (1968). The Garland of Philip. The Greek Anthology, 2. Vol. I–II. Cambridge: University Press.
- Lane, N. (2022). "Roger Dawe". Bulletin of the Council of University Classical Departments. 51: 1–4.
- Lloyd-Jones, H. (1978). "The Text of Sophocles". CR. N. S. 28 (2): 214–221. JSTOR 3062230.
- Lloyd-Jones, H. (1981). "The Text of Sophocles". CR. N. S. 31 (2): 167–173. JSTOR 3063812.
