= Manolis Papathomopoulos =

Greek classical philologist and byzantinist

Emmanuel (Manolis) Papathomopoulos (Greek: Εμμανουήλ "Μανόλης" Παπαθομόπουλος; 1930 – 20 April 2011) was a Greek classical philologist, Byzantinist and university professor, Professor of classical philology at the University of Ioannina.

== Life ==
Papathomopoulos graduated in 1957 from the Sorbonne University and began his career as attaché de recherche (Research fellow) at the Paris CNRS in 1963–1964; in 1968–1969 he became research associate at Peterhouse College (University of Cambridge). From 1968 to 1997 he taught classical philology at the University of Ioannina.

Together with Andreas Papandreou, Papathomopoulos founded the PASOK in 1974.

== Research activity ==
Papathomopoulos was a prolific textual critic of classical and Byzantine texts. He wrote no less than 30 books, many of which consisting in critical editions, and some 60 papers, on top of compiling concordances to Apollonius of Rhodes, Nicander, Oppian, Quintus Smyrnaeus and Sophocles. He initially worked on Greek literature of the imperial age, publishing a critical edition of the Metamorphoses by Antoninus Liberalis and of anonymous parapraseis of poems by Dionysius Periegetes, Oppian and Nicander; at the same time, he began working on the Byzantine scholar Maximus Planudes, publishing the critical edition of his Greek translation of Ovid's Epistles of Heroines. He would went on to publish Planudes's translations of Augustine's De trinitate, of Boethius's Consolation of Philosophy, of Ovid's Metamorphoses and of the Distica Catonis. In 2003 he published the Teubner text of Oppian.

== Works ==
- Antoninus Liberalis (1968). Papathomopoulos, M. (ed.). Les Métamorphoses. Collection Budé. Paris: Les Belles Lettres.
- Anonymus (1976a). Papathomopoulos, M. (ed.). Παράφρασις εἰς τὰ Διονυσίου Ἰξευτικά. Ioannina: Πανεπιστήμιο Ιωαννίνων.
- Anonymus (1976b). Papathomopoulos, M. (ed.). Παράφρασις εἰς τὰ Ὀππιάνου Ἁλιευτικά. Ioannina: Πανεπιστήμιο Ιωαννίνων.
- Eutecnius (1976). Papathomopoulos, M. (ed.). Παραφράσεις εἰς τὰ Νικάνδρου Θηριακὰ καὶ Ἀλεξιφαρμακά. Ioannina: Πανεπιστήμιο Ιωαννίνων.
- Maximus Planudes (1976). Papathomopoulos, M. (ed.). Μετάφρασις τῶν Ὀβιδίου ἐπιστολῶν. Ioannina: Πανεπιστήμιο Ιωαννίνων.
- Papathomopoulos, M., ed. (1980). Nouveaux fragments d’auteurs Anciens. Ioannina: Πανεπιστήμιο Ιωαννίνων.
- Papathomopoulos, M. (1989). Aesopus Revisitatus. Recherches sur le texte des Vies Esopiques. Vol. I: La critique textuelle. Ioannina: Πανεπιστήμιο Ιωαννίνων.
- Papathomopoulos, M., ed. (1990). Ὁ βίος τοῦ Αἰσώπου. Ἡ παραλλαγὴ G. Ioannina: Πανεπιστήμιο Ιωαννίνων.
- Papathomopoulos, M. (1990). Varia philologica et papyrologica. Vol. I. Ioannina: Πανεπιστήμιο Ιωαννίνων. (Kleine Schriften)
- Maximus Planudes (1995). Papathomopoulos, M.; Tsavari, I.; Rigotti, G. (eds.). Μετάφρασις τοῦ Αὐγουστίνου περὶ Τριάδος. Athens: Ακαδημίας Αθηνών.
- Papathomopoulos, M.; Jeffreys, E., eds. (1996). Ὁ Πόλεμος τῆς Τροάδος. Athens: MIET. ISBN 960-250-118-9.
- Papathomopoulos, M. (1996). Apollonii Rhodii concordantia. Hildesheim – Zürich – New York: Weidmann–Olms Verlag.
- Papathomopoulos, M. (1996). Nicandri Theriacorum et Alexipharmacorum concordantia. Hildesheim – Zürich – New York: Weidmann–Olms Verlag.
- Papathomopoulos, M. (1997). Oppianus Apameensis Cynegeticorum concordantia. Hildesheim – Zürich – New York: Weidmann–Olms Verlag.
- Maximus Planudes (1999). Papathomopoulos, M. (ed.). Μετάφρασις Βοηθοῦ περὶ παραμυθίας τῆς φιλοσοφίας. Corpus Philosophorum Medii Aevii, Philosophi Byzantini, 9. Athens: Ακαδημίας Αθηνών. ISBN 960-7099-70-2.
- Papathomopoulos, M., ed. (1999). Ὁ βίος τοῦ Αἰσώπου. Ἡ παραλλαγὴ W. Athens: Εκδόσεις Παπαδήμα.
- Papathomopoulos, M., ed. (1999). Πέντε δημώδεις μεταφράσεις τοῦ βίου τοῦ Αἰσώπου. Athens: Εκδόσεις Παπαδήμα.
- Maximus Planudes (2002). Papathomopoulos, M.; Tsavari, I. (eds.). Μετάφρασις τοῦ Ὀβιδίου περὶ μεταμωρφώσεων. Athens: Ακαδημίας Αθηνών.
- Ovidius (2002). Papathomopoulos, M.; Tsavari, I. (eds.). Metamorphoseon libri XV. Vol. I: Libri I–II. Athens: Ακαδημίας Αθηνών.
- Papathomopoulos, M. (2002). Concordantia in Quinti Smyrnaei Posthomerica. Hildesheim – Zürich – New York: Weidmann–Olms Verlag.
- Oppianus; Eutecnius (2003). Papathomopoulos, M. (ed.). Cynegetica – Paraphrasis metro soluta. Bibliotheca Teubneriana. München: K. G. Saur.
- Papathomopoulos, M. (2003). Concordantia Sophocles. Hildesheim – Zürich – New York: Weidmann–Olms Verlag.
- Iohannes Tzetzes (2007). Papathomopoulos, M. (ed.). Ἐξηγήσις εἰς τὴν Ὁμήρου Ἰλιάδα. Athens: Ακαδημίας Αθηνών.
- Papathomopoulos, M. (2007). Ποικίλα Φιλολογικά. Vol. II. Athens: Εκδόσεις Παπαδήμα. (Kleine Schriften)
- Papathomopoulos, M. (2007). Ποικίλα Φιλολογικά. Vol. III. Athens: Εκδόσεις Παπαδήμα. (Kleine Schriften)
- Papathomopoulos, M. (2008). Ποικίλα Φιλολογικά. Vol. IV. Athens: Εκδόσεις Παπαδήμα. (Kleine Schriften)
- Maximus Planudes (2009). Papathomopoulos, M. (ed.). Μετάφρασις τῶν «Dicta Catonis». Athens: Εκδόσεις Αλήθεια.
- Apollodorus (2010). Papathomopoulos, M. (ed.). Bibliotheca. Athens: Εκδόσεις Αλήθεια.
- Diogenes (2010). Papathomopoulos, M. (ed.). Παιδιόφραστος διήγησις τῶν ζῴων τῶν τετραπόδων. Athens: Εκδόσεις Αλήθεια.
