= Antonio Garzya =

Italian classical scholar and philologist (1927–2012)

- Born: 22 January 1927; Brindisi, Italy
- Died: 6 March 2012 (aged 85); Telese Terme, Italy
- Citizenship: Italian
- Occupation: University professor
- Known for: Classical philology

Academic background
- Education: University of Naples Federico II

Academic work
- Discipline: Ancient Literature
- Sub-discipline: Byzantine Studies
- Institutions: University of Macerata University of Naples Federico II

Antonio Garzya (born 22 January 1927 in Brindisi, died 6 March 2012 in Telese Terme) was an Italian classical scholar, philologist, and university professor.

Emeritus professor of Greek literature at the University of Naples Federico II, he was a specialist of ancient Greek and Byzantine studies.

== Biography ==
After attending the P. Colonna Gymnasium in Galatina (province of Lecce) and the G. Palmieri Lyceum in Lecce, Garzya studied Classical Philology at the University of Naples. He took his degree with a thesis on Andromache by Euripides.

In 1953 he started his teaching career, which he pursued from 1954 until 1966 in public secondary schools.

In 1960 he became an instructor of Byzantine Philology and Papyrology at the University of Naples. From 1965 until 1966 he was a school principal and then interrupted that activity from 1966 to 1968 to be Professor of Byzantine Studies at the University of Macerata, where, at the same time, he taught Latin literature. From 1969 to 1980 he was a professor of Byzantine Philology at the University of Naples. At the same time, from 1973 to 1983, he taught Philology of Medieval and Modern Greek and in 1976 was guest professor of Byzantine Studies at the University of Vienna. In 1981, he moved his professorship to the first chair of Greek Literature of the University of Naples and from 1984 to 1988 was Associate Professor of Medieval Greek at the Sorbonne in Paris. In 1993 he became a member of UPRESA 8062 “Médecine grecque” (formerly URA 1255) des CNRS in Paris. In 1997 he retired from his teaching duties and was nominated Emeritus shortly after.

Garzya published the journal Κοινωνία and the series Speculum (D’Auria, Naples) as well as Hellenica et Bizantina Neapolitana (Bibliopolis, Naples) and Classici greci: Sezione tardoantica e bizantina (UTET, Turin). He was a member of the publishing boards of Revue des études grecques (Paris), of Cuadernos de filología clásica (Madrid), of Rivista di studi bizantini e neoellenici (Rome), of Bizantinistica (formerly Rivista di bizantinistica, Bologne), of Archivio di storia della cultura (Naples ) and of Magna Graecia (Cosenza).

Garzya's awards include an honorary doctorate from the University of Toulouse in 1967, membership in the Accademia Pontaniana in Naples in 1970 (then chairman of that institution in 2002 and then chairman emeritus) and, in 1981, membership of the Accademia di Archeologia, Lettere e Belle Arti della Società Nazionale di Scienze Lettere e Arti in Naples and subsequent chairman of that institution from 1997 to 2000. In 1974 he became a corresponding member in the Austrian Academy of Sciences, in 1980 an honorary member in the Εταιρεία Βυζαντινών Σπουδών (Athens), in 2001 an ordinary member of the Accademia delle Scienze (Turin), and in 2001 a member in the Academy of Athens. From 1980 he was vice-president of the International Association of Byzantine Studies and from 1993 honorary president of the Association of Late Antique Studies.

Garzya was married to Jacqueline Maguy Peeters (b. 1924 in Belgium – †2012 Naples). The couple had 2 children: Giacomo (b.1952) and Chiara (b.1955).

== Research ==
Garzya was primarily concerned with literary criticism of ancient, late antique and Byzantine Greek.

His focus in ancient literature was on archaic Choral poetry (Alcman) and elegy (Theognis), classical tragedy (Euripides) and Ancient Greek Comedy (Menander) and the Roman comedies of Plautus. He edited Alcman' fragments and Theognis' elegies, and then Euripides' Heracleidae (1972), Andromache (1978) and Alcestis (1980; 2nd ed. 1983) for the Bibliotheca Teubneriana.

Starting from the end of the 1950s Garzya turned his attention to Greek literary works of Late Antiquity (Synesius, Procopius of Gaza) and Byzantine times (Theodore the Studite; Michael Psellos; Nikephoros Basilakes, c. 1115–shortly after 1182; Theodoros Prodromos; the cento "Christus patiens"). He was also concerned with isolated texts such as the prose version of Dionysius Periegetes' poem on bird catching (which he edited for the Bibliotheca Teubneriana in 1963) and the "Voskopula", an anonymous pastoral poem from Cretan Renaissance. Regarding Byzantine texts, he researched extensively on both poetry and prose, producing the critical edition of Theodore the Studite's poems, of Nikephoros Basilakes' panegyric for Alexios Komnenos (1965: editio princeps) and then of his orations and epistles for the Bibliotheca Teubneriana (1984). He also studied the 4th-century Christian bishop, writer, and hymnographer Synesius, producing the critical edition of his epistles (1979) and the translation and commentary of all Synesius' works (1989). In 2000, he returned to Synesius' epistles again, revising his own 1979 critical text for the Collection Budé. In the meantime, he edited a translation and commentary of the first five books of Cosmas Indicopleustes' "Christian Topography" (1992).

In the 1990s he became increasingly interested in ancient and medieval medicine. As a result of his researches, he edited (with other scholars) an edition with translation and commentary of the "Problems" by Cassius Iatrosofista (2004) and a collection of Byzantine medical works (Oribasius, Aëtius of Amida, Alexander of Tralles, Paul of Aegina; 2006).

== Bibliography ==
Garzya's full bibliography up to 1997 can be found in:

- Guardasole, Alessia (1997). "Bibliografia di Antonio Garzya". In Criscuolo, Ugo; Maisano, Riccardo (eds.). Synodia. Studia humanitatis Antonio Garzya septuagenario ab amicis atque discipulis dicata. Napoli: M. D’Auria Editore. pp. 1007–1033.

This bibliography reaches around seven hundred entries.

=== Monographs ===
- Studi su Euripide e Menandro. Napoli: G. Scalabrini. 1961.
- Pensiero e tecnica drammatica in Euripide. Napoli: Libreria Scientifica. 1962.
- Studi sulla lirica greca da Alcmane al primo impero. Biblioteca di cultura contemporanea, 83. Messina–Firenze: Casa editrice G. D’Anna. 1963.
- Storia della letteratura greca. Torino: Paravia. 1972.
- Guida alla traduzione dal greco. UTET Libreria, Torino, 1991.
- Garzya, Antonio; Gigante, Marcello; Polara, Giovanni (1983). Omaggio a B. G. Teubner. Un grande editore e gli studi classici. Radici, 1. Napoli: D'Auria.
- Garzya, Antonio; Vallet, Georges; D'Elia, Salvatore (1985). Omaggio a Les Belles Lettres. Cultura francese e studi classici. Radici, 4. Napoli: D'Auria.
- Pensiero e tecnica drammatica in Euripide (2nd ed.). Napoli: Libreria Scientifica. 1987.
- Associazione Italiana di Studi Bizantini (1996). Garzya, Antonio (ed.). Bibliografia della Bizantinistica Italiana 1960–1979. Napoli: D'Auria.
- Associazione Italiana di Studi Bizantini (2001). Garzya, Antonio (ed.). Bibliografia della Bizantinistica Italiana 1900–1959. Napoli: D'Auria.

=== Editions of texts ===
The many authors whose texts Garzya edited are arranged alphabetically.

==== Alcman ====
- Alcmane (1954). I frammenti. Testo critico, traduzione, commentario. Con 1 tav. fuori testo. Napoli: Casa Editrice dr. Silvio Viti.

==== Byzantine medical texts ====
- Garzya, Antonio; De Lucia, Roberto; Guardasole, Alessia; Ieraci Bio, Anna Maria; Lamagna, Mario; Romano, Roberto, eds. (2006). Medici bizantini (Oribasio, Aezio, Alessandro di Tralle, Paolo di Egina, Leone). Classici greci. Autori della tarda antichità e dell'età bizantina. Torino: UTET.

==== Cassius ====
- Cassio Iatrosofista (2004). Garzya, Antonio; Masullo, Rita (eds.). I problemi. Quaderni dell'Accademia Pontaniana 38. Testo critico, introduzione, apparato critico, traduzione e note. Napoli: Accademia Pontaniana.

==== Cosmas Indicopleustes ====
- Cosma Indicopleusta (1992). Garzya, Antonio (ed.). Topografia cristiana. Libri 1–5. Radici. Premessa di Wanda Wolska-Conus, postfazione di Riccardo Maisano. Napoli: D'Auria.

==== Dionysius ====
- Dionysius (1963). Garzya, Antonio (ed.). Ixeuticon seu de Aucupio libri tres in epitomen metro solutam redacti. Bibliotheca Scriptorum Graecorum et Romanorum Teubneriana. Leipzig: B. G. Teubner.

==== Euripides ====
- Euripides (1972). Garzya, Antonio (ed.). Heraclidae. Bibliotheca Scriptorum Graecorum et Romanorum Teubneriana. Leipzig: B. G. Teubner.
- Euripides (1978). Garzya, Antonio (ed.). Andromacha. Bibliotheca Scriptorum Graecorum et Romanorum Teubneriana. Leipzig: B. G. Teubner.
- Euripides (1980). Garzya, Antonio (ed.). Alcestis. Bibliotheca Scriptorum Graecorum et Romanorum Teubneriana (1st ed.). Leipzig: B. G. Teubner.
- Euripides (1983). Garzya, Antonio (ed.). Alcestis. Bibliotheca Scriptorum Graecorum et Romanorum Teubneriana (2nd ed.). Leipzig: B. G. Teubner.

==== Michael Psellos ====
- Garzya, Antonio (1964). "Versi inediti di Michele Psello". Le Parole e le Idee. 6: 7–28.
- Garzya, Antonio (1965). "Un opuscolo polemico inedito di Michele Psello". Le Parole e le Idee. 7: 27–36.
- Garzya, Antonio (1965). "Un encomio del vino inedito di Michele Psello". Byzantion. 35 (2): 418–428. JSTOR 44170147.
- Garzya, Antonio (1966). "On Michael Psellus' Admission of Faith". Ἐπετηρὶς Ἑταιρείας Βυζαντινῶν Σπουδῶν. 25: 41–46.

The first two articles were revised and reprinted in: Garzya, Antonio, ed. (1966). Versi e un opuscolo polemico inedito di Michele Psello. Quaderni di 'Le Parole e le Idee', 4. Nota introduttiva, testo critico, traduzione e commentario. Napoli: Le Parole e le Idee Editrice. This volume and the edition of Psellus' admission of faith were reprinted without modifications in: Garzya, Antonio (1974). Storia e interpretazione di testi bizantini. Collected Studies, 28. Prefazione di Raffaele Cantarella. London: Variorum Reprints. Chapters IV–V.

==== Nikephoros Basilakes ====
- Niceforo Basilace (1965). Garzya, Antonio (ed.). Encomio per Adriano Comneno. Speculum. Sez. commenti, 1. Testo edito per la prima volta, con apparato critico, introduzione e commentario. Napoli: Scalabrini.
- Nicephorus Basilaces (1984). Garzya, Antonio (ed.). Orationes et epistulae. Bibliotheca Scriptorum Graecorum et Romanorum Teubneriana. Leipzig: B. G. Teubner.

==== Procopius of Gaza ====
- Procopius Gazaeus (1963). Garzya, Antonio; Loenertz, Raymond-Joseph (eds.). Epistulae et Declamationes. Studia Patristica et Byzantina, 9. Ettal: Buch-Kunstverlag.

==== Synesius of Cyrene ====
- Synesius Cyrenensis (1979). Garzya, Antonio (ed.). Epistulae. Scriptores Graeci et Latini consilio Academiae Lynceorum editi. Romae: Typis Officinae Polygraphicae.
- Sinesio di Cirene (1989). Garzya, Antonio (ed.). Opere. Epistole, operette, inni. Classici greci. Autori della tarda antichità e dell'età bizantina. Torino: UTET.
- Synésios de Cyrène (2000). Garzya, Antonio (ed.). Correspondance: Lettres 1–63. Collection des universités de France. Sér. Grecque 397. Vol. II. Translated by Roques, Denys. Paris: Les Belles Lettres.
- Synésios de Cyrène (2000). Garzya, Antonio (ed.). Correspondance: Lettres 64–156. Collection des universités de France. Sér. Grecque 397. Vol. III. Translated by Roques, Denys. Paris: Les Belles Lettres.

==== Theodore the Studite ====
- Garzya, Antonio (1958). "Theodori Studitae epigrammata". Ἐπετηρὶς Ἑταιρείας Βυζαντινῶν Σπουδῶν. 28: 11–64.

==== Theognis ====
- Teognide (1958). Elegie. Libri 1–2. Testo critico, introduzione, traduzione e note con una scelta di testimonianze antiche e un lessico. Firenze: Sansoni.

==== Voskopula ====
- Anonimo Cretese (1973). La Pastorella (Ἡ βοσκοπούλα). Translated by Garzya, Antonio. Napoli: La Buona Stampa.

=== Select articles and papers ===
A collection of his works on Byzantine texts and authors is reprinted in Garzya, Antonio (1974). Storia e interpretazione di testi bizantini. Saggi e ricerche. Collected studies, 28. Prefazione di Raffaele Cantarella. London: Variorum Reprints.

== Literature ==
- "Bibliografia di Antonio Garzya", ed. Alessia Guardasole, in: Synodia. Studia humanitatis Antonio Garzya septuagenario ab amicis atque discipulis dicata. M. D’Auria ed. Naples 1997, pp. 1007–1033.
- Ugo Criscuolo, Riccardo Maisano (Hrsg.): Synodia. Studia humanitatis Antonio Garzya septuagenario ab amicis atque discipulis dicata. M. D’Auria Editore, Naples, 1997.
- Riccardo Maisano: Antonio Garzya bizantinista. In: Ugo Criscuolo (publisher.), L’Antico e la sua eredità. Atti del Colloquio internazionale di studi in onore di Antonio Garzya (Naples, 20–21 September 2002). M. D’Auria, Naples 2004, S. 195–198, (online) (PDF).
- Literature by and about Antonio Garzya in the SUDOC-Catalog (Union of French University Librarians)
- Publications by Antonio Garzya in the RI-Opac of the Regesta Imperii
- Publications by Antonio Garzya in the OPAC of Monumenta Germaniae Historica
