= Otto Kern =

German classical philologist, archaeologist and epigraphist

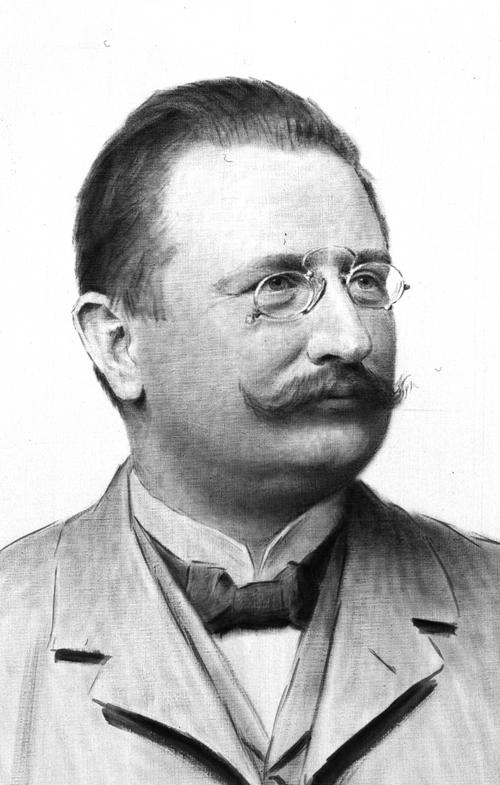
Otto Kern, oil painting by Paul Moennich, 1906

Otto Ferdinand Georg Kern (14 February 1863 in Schulpforte (now part of Bad Kösen) – 31 January 1942 in Halle an der Saale) was a German classical philologist, archaeologist and epigraphist. He specialized in the field of ancient Greek religion, being known for his investigations of Greek mystery cults and Orphism, as well as the ancient city of Magnesia on the Maeander and later also the history of ancient studies. In 1907 he became professor at the University of Halle-Wittenberg, where he became rector in 1915/16.

== Biography ==
=== Early life ===
Otto Kern was born near Naumburg an der Saale. His father Franz Kern was a senior teacher at the Pforta State School at the time, and later became the school's headmaster. Otto's mother was the 14 years younger Clara Kern, born Runge. His father introduced him at an early age to the Greeks and to German literature, especially Goethe. In Stettin, Otto Kern attended grammar school, where his religion teacher Anton Jonas introduced him to the history of religion. From 1883 to 1887 he studied classical philology and archaeology at the universities of Berlin and Göttingen. His lecturers there were renowned scientists such as Ernst Curtius, Ulrich von Wilamowitz-Moellendorff as well as Hermann Diels and Carl Robert, whose lives he later examined in a biography. Kern received his doctorate on 21 January 1888 in Berlin with his dissertation De Orphei Epimenidis Pherecydis theogoniis quaestiones criticae. After his doctorate he worked in Berlin as assistant to Carl Robert until 1889.

=== Career ===
In the following years (from 1889) he worked as an archaeologist in Italy, Greece and Asia Minor. From 1889 to 1891 he was a scholarship holder of the German Archaeological Institute (DAI) and was able to travel the Mediterranean region. From 1891 he dug together with Carl Humann in the ancient city of Magnesia at the Mäander. He also dealt with this city in his postdoctoral thesis on the history of the foundation of Magnesia on the Maeander from 1894.

In 1894 he qualified as a private lecturer for classical philology in Berlin, where he also worked as an assistant in the sculpture department of the Royal Museums. In 1897 Kern was appointed associate professor at the University of Rostock. from 1900 he was full professor there. In 1907 he moved to the University of Halle-Wittenberg, where he was elected Rector in 1915/16. In Halle he founded the religious-historical working group "Thiasos".

In 1922 he refused a call to the University of Hamburg. Before his retirement in 1931 he travelled 1925-1926 again to Thessaly. He received two honorary doctorates from the University of Halle:

- 1929 from the Faculty of Law and Political Science,
- 1930 from the Faculty of Theology.

=== Later life and death ===
In 1937 he was elected a corresponding member of the Göttingen Academy of Sciences.

Kern became a member of the right-wing radical German Fatherland Party and then of the German National People's Party (DNVP).

Otto Kern died on 31 January 1942 at the age of 78. Parts of his estate are in the possession of the Göttingen University Library (Wilamowitz biography), the Central Archive of the National Museums in Berlin (materials on the Pozzo drawings) and the Archive of the German Archaeological Institute (a letter).

== Works ==
Among his better written efforts was a three part work on the religious history of ancient Greece, "Die Religion der Griechen" (1926–38):

- Vol. 1. Von den Anfängen bis Hesiod – Prior to Hesiod.
- Vol. 2. Die Hochblüte bis zum Ausgange des fünften Jahrhunderts – The Golden Age up until the start of the 5th century BC.
- Vol. 3. Von Platon bis Kaiser Julian – From Plato up to the Emperor Julian.

Other significant works by Kern include:

- Die Gründungsgeschichte von Magnesia am Maiandros, 1894 – The founding history of Magnesia on the Maeander.
- Beiträge zur Geschichte der griechischen Philosophie und Religion (with Paul Wendland), 1895 – Contributions to the history of Greek philosophy and religion.
- Ueber die Anfänge der hellenischen Religion, 1902 – On the beginnings of Hellenic religion.
- Eleusinische Beiträge, 1909 – Eleusinian contributions.
- Nord-griechische Skizzen, 1912 – Sketches of northern Greece.
- "Inscriptiones Graecae", 1913.
- Orpheus. Eine religionsgeschichtliche Untersuchung, 1920 – Orpheus; a religious-historical study.
- "Orphicorum fragmenta", 1922. Internet Archive.
