= Tiberius Claudius Donatus =

Roman writer and grammarian

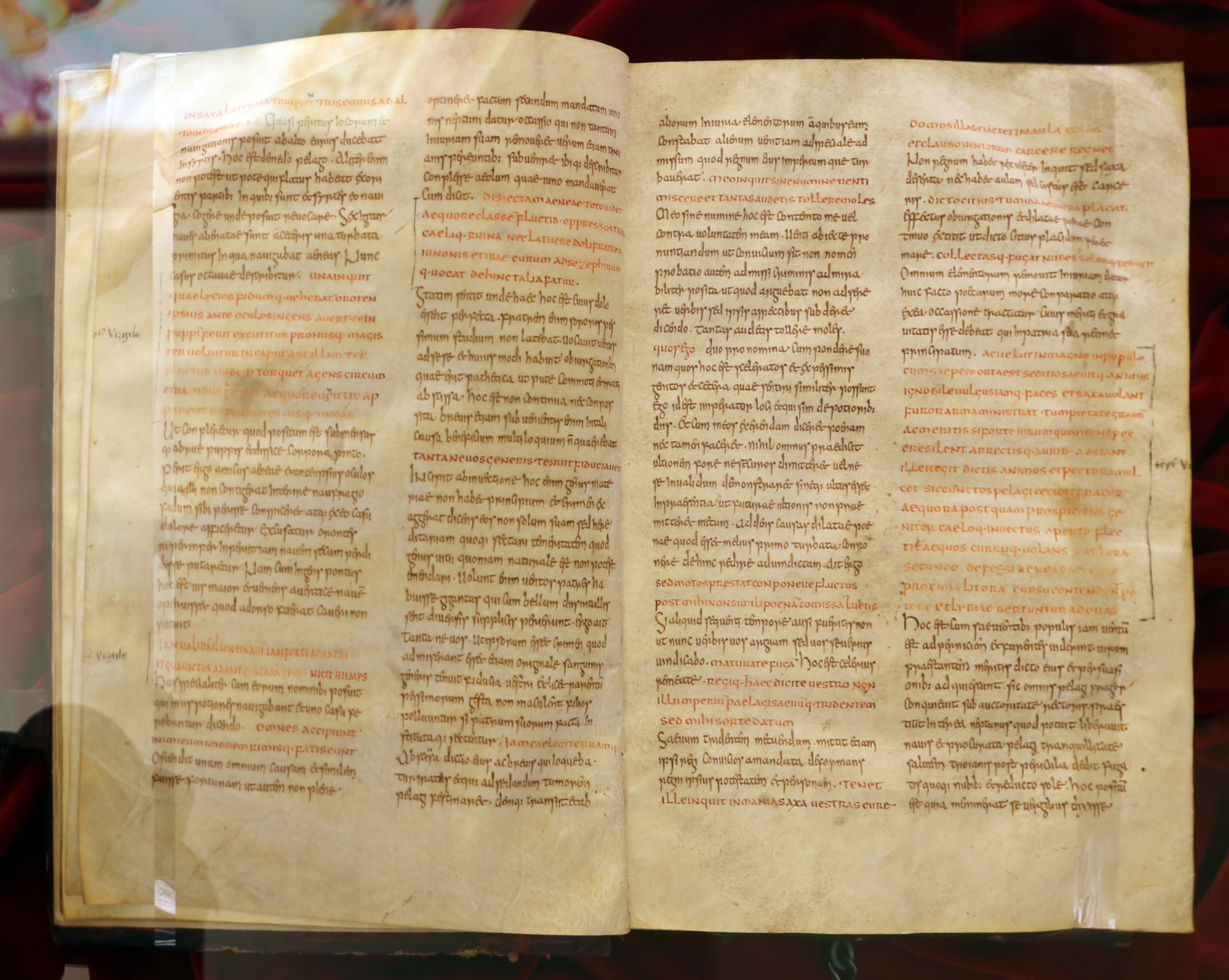
Interpretationes Vergilianae

Tiberius Claudius Donatus was a Roman Latin grammarian of the late 4th and early 5th century AD of whom a single work is known, the Interpretationes Vergilianae, a commentary on Virgil's Aeneid. His work, rediscovered in 1438, proved popular in the early modern age; 55 editions of this book were printed between 1488 and 1599.

In his commentary, Donatus claims that the Aeneid is a work of rhetoric with the intention of praising Aeneas, stating that it is best explained by rhetors, not grammarians; therefore, he sticks to a strict literal analysis of the text. He also criticizes existing criticisms of the Aeneid, saying that they fail to identify Virgil's apparent rhetorical advocacy for Aeneas. Donatus also maintains that Virgil was not a philosopher but rather a teacher, and that the best way to read the Aeneid is with an understanding of its universal scope.

He should not be confused with Aelius Donatus, even though both are known for writing about Virgil.

Donatus had a son by the name of Tiberius Claudius Maximus Donatianus, to whom he dedicated his Interpretationes.
