= Barace =

Barace may refer to,

- Baracé, France
- Barace (Bacare), an ancient port in southern India; sometimes identified with modern Purakkad, Kerala state
- Barace (surname)
