= Julius Platzmann =

German illustrator, linguist (1832–1902)

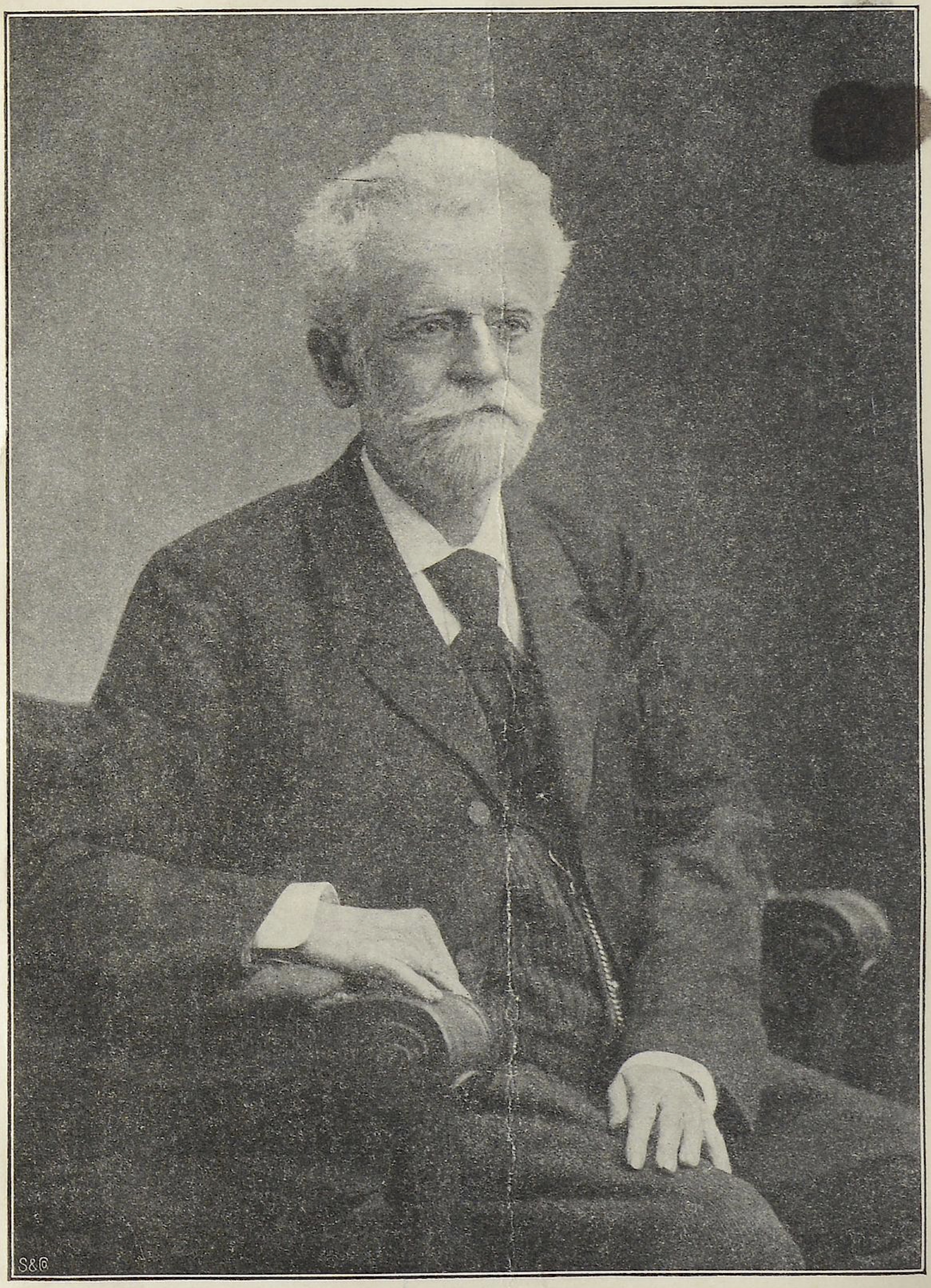
- Julius Platzmann
- Born: January 31, 1832; Leipzig, Kingdom of Saxony
- Died: September 6, 1902 (aged 70); Leipzig, German Empire
- Citizenship: German Empire
- Occupations: botanical illustrator, linguist and facsimilist

Academic work
- Discipline: Native languages of South America

Karl Julius Platzmann (31 January 1832 – 6 September 1902) was a German bibliophile, writer, editor and botanical illustrator, known for his typographic facsimile editions of colonial-era missionary grammars and dictionaries of indigenous American languages. Trained as an artist, he lived in Brazil from 1858 to 1864, producing many botanical illustrations. After returning to Germany he led a retiring life devoted to collecting rare grammars, vocabularies and catechisms, which he republished as page-for-page facsimiles. These editions made many otherwise inaccessible works available to scholars and remain widely cited in the study of South American languages.

== Early life and education ==
Platzmann was born in Leipzig on January 31, 1832. His family was wealthy and influential in Leipzig society. His mother Marianna Platzmann (née Beyer) inherited family wealth. His father Theodor Alexander Platzmann (b. 1795) was a jurist and member of the Saxon State Parliament (Landtag). Like many wealthy German families of the time, the family kept both urban and country homes — Platzmann grew up spending summers on the family estate of Hohnstädt near Grimma, not far from the intellectual hub of Leipzig, where his family also owned a home on Reichstrasse. Like his father and brothers, he studied at one of the three prestigious Fürstenschule ("princely schools") in Saxony. Theodor had attended Pforta in Schulpforte, and the sons attended Grimma (Note: The record reads: Platzmann Karl Julius M. 47 – 21/12 50 * Leipzig 31/5 32 v Dr. iur. u. Rathsherr; Dr. phil., 50 auf d. Kunstakademie Dresden, 58 auf Reisen i. Brasilien, 64 Privatgelehrt. Leipzig, Mitgl. verschied. gelehrt. Gesellschaften b 42, 44, 50 bs 82, A. 84. [Translation: Platzmann, Karl Julius. Entered the school Michaelmas 1847 – left 21 Dec 1850; born in Leipzig, 31 May 1832; son of a Doctor of Law and city councillor; Doctor of Philosophy. In 1850 at the Art Academy in Dresden, in 1858 traveling in Brazil, from 1864 a private scholar in Leipzig; member of various learned societies.]) near the family estate in Hohnstädt.

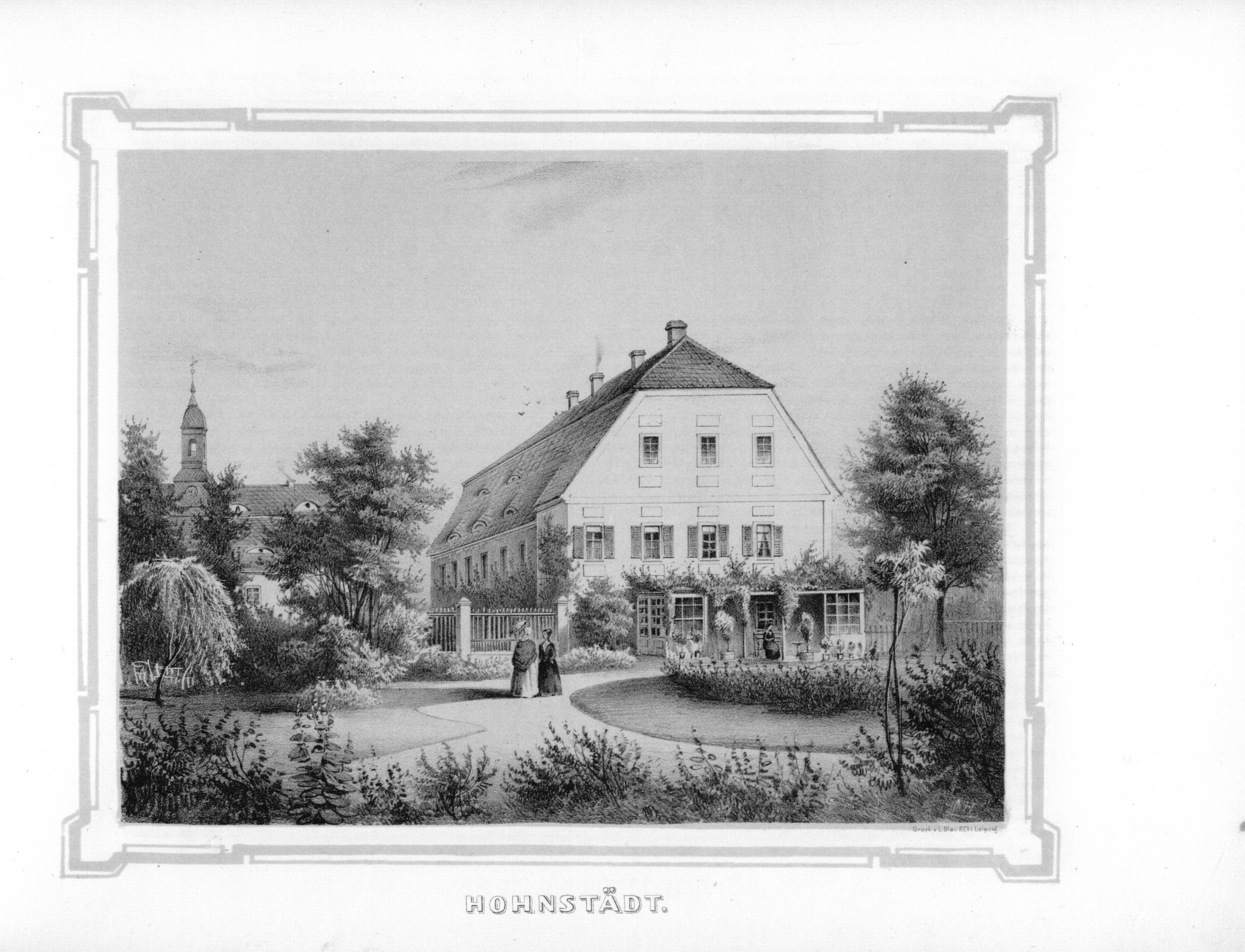
The Platzmann family manorial estate at Hohnstädt.

Many Fürstenschule alumni would go on to study at the University of Leipzig. Platzmann, however, had a longstanding interest in art, and after three years at the Fürstenschule, he transferred to the Dresden Academy of Fine Arts in 1850. His teachers would include Gustav Jäger, Julius Schnorr von Carolsfeld, Ernst Friedrich August Rietschel and Adrian Ludwig Richter.

Several of Platzmann's works were exhibited at the Dresden academy. In his diary, Schnorr records high praise of Platzmann's talents as an artist, and even having been inspired to modify one of his own works in light of one of Platzmann's compositions. However, he also felt that Platzmann's potential as a fine artist had limits.

== Botanical illustrator in Brazil — 1858-1864 ==
In his 1893 memoir Platzmann mentions that he "wanted to see tropical vegetation", and that Schnorr wrote him a letter of recommendation suitable for use abroad. Thus, in 1858 Platzmann set out for Paranaguá, in the Brazilian state of Paraná, in order to study and draw the local flora. He lived with a local Brazilian family in order to learn Portuguese, and then moved to the small island (Ilha dos Pinheiros) where he would live and work for some years. He eventually bought a small parcel of land on the mainland, hoping to be close to more diverse flora, but he soon thereafter returned to Germany. It is not clear what motivated this apparent change in plans.

Although Platzmann would cease to produce botanical illustrations after his return to Germany, the work he had created during his journey to Brazil was scientifically consequential and brought him some renown. His double illustration of Phallocallis plumbea (now known as Trimezia martinicensis) and Cypella coerulea appeared as a plate in the influential Flora Brasiliensis. An analytical drawing of Billbergia amoena was printed in the Belgian botanical journal La Belgique Horticole. He published a series of Pflanzenstudien (Plant studies) in 1865-1866 in the popular magazine, Illustrirte Zeitung. The first installment described Lophophytum mirabile, in which Platzmann describes how he encountered the plant during a tapir hunt. (That article was later referenced in the monumental plant catalog Prodromus systematis naturalis regni vegetabilis.) Other installments of the series include descriptions and illustrations of Araucaria brasiliensis, Cecropia peltata, Carica papaya, and Musa sapientum. One review of his Pflanzenstudien called him a "brilliant artist" and "hoped that these plates—the fruit of years of study undertaken amidst hardships and struggles of every kind—will gain the recognition they deserve through worthy reproduction or inclusion in a renowned scientific collection."

While these as well as his watercolor illustrations were exhibited to considerable acclaim, as far afield as London, Platzmann seems never published his Brazilian work as a whole. Some work remained in the possession of his family. In one letter to correspondent and mentor Carl Friedrich Philipp von Martius, Platzmann mused about the possibility of using his Brazilian works as a submission for a doctoral degree at a German university (the modern system of doctoral advisors was only incipient in Platzmann's time).

Botanical illustrations by Julius Platzmann
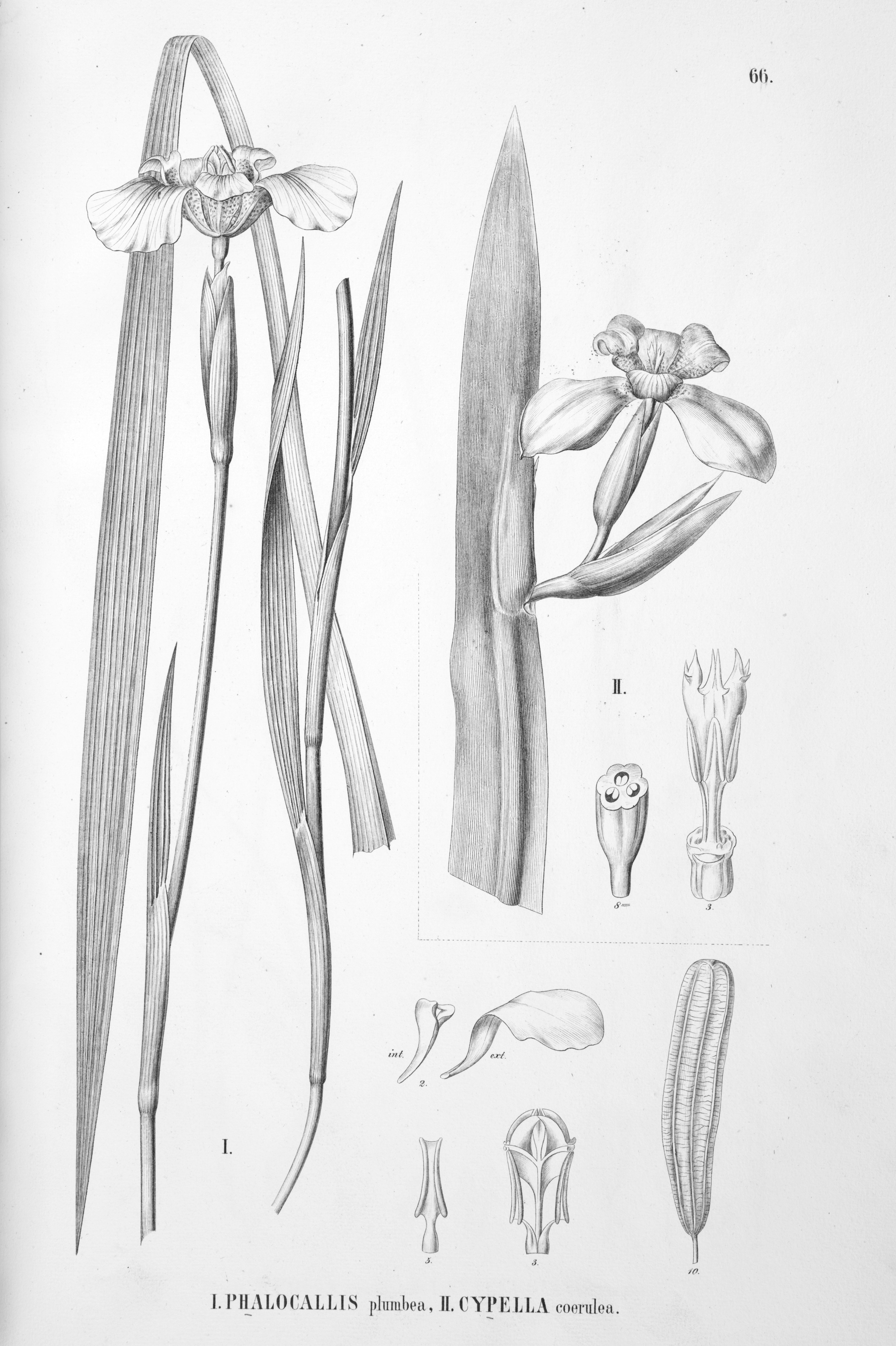
1. Trimezia martinicensis and 2. Cypella coerulea

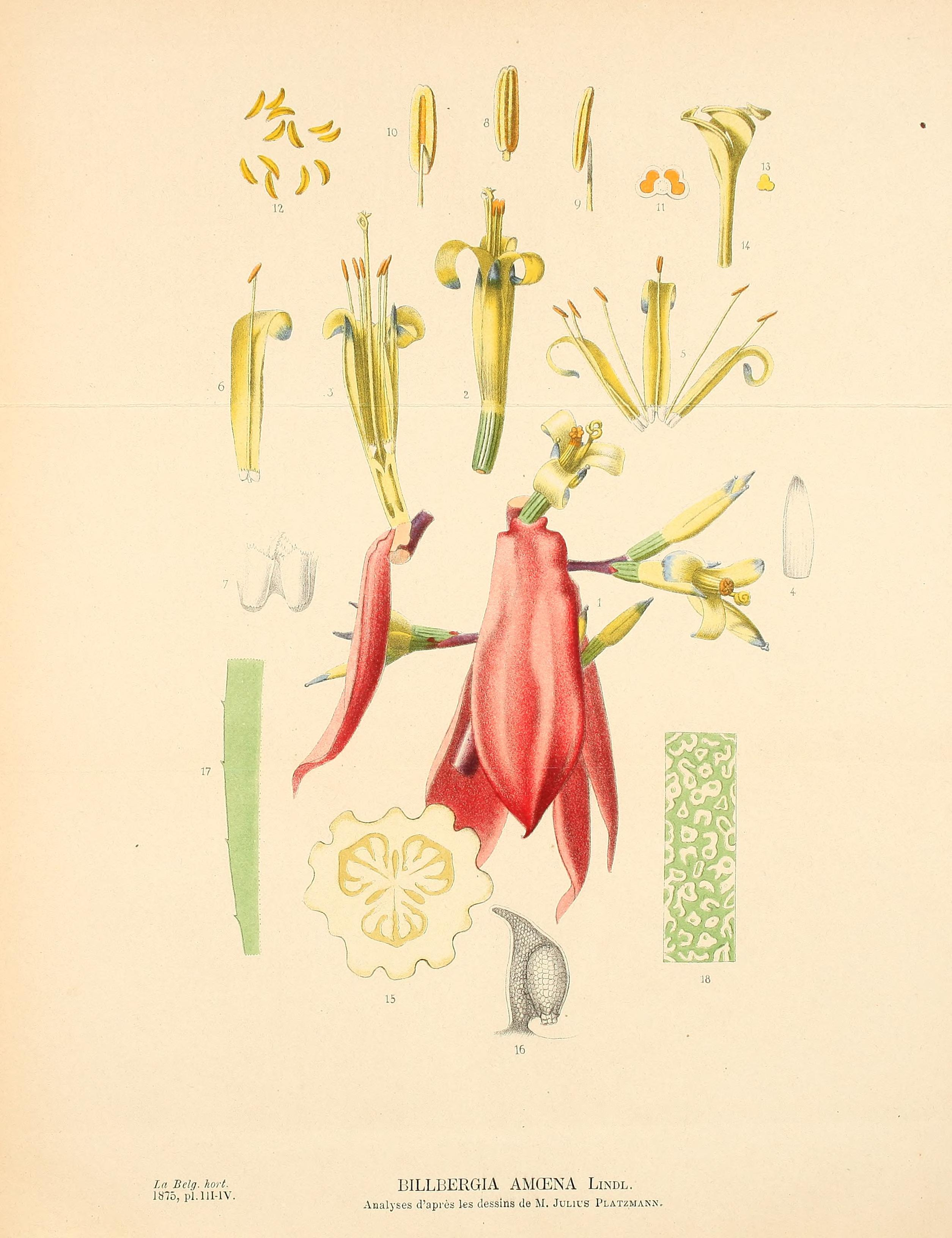
Billbergia amoena

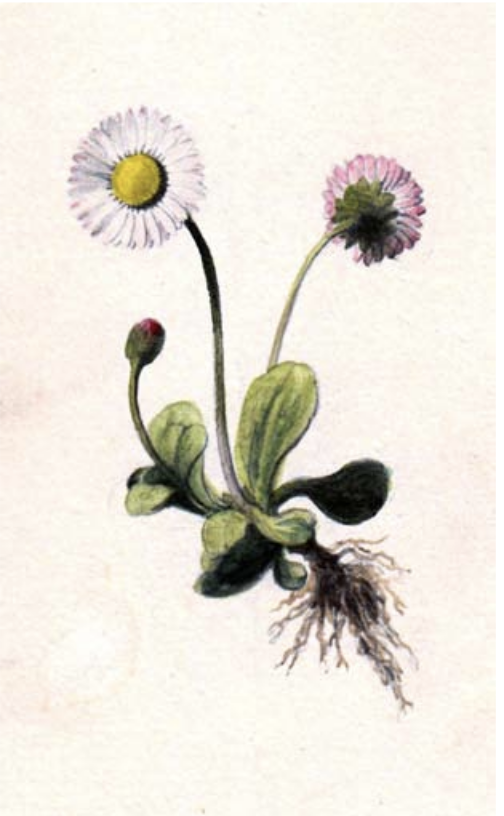
Bellis perennis

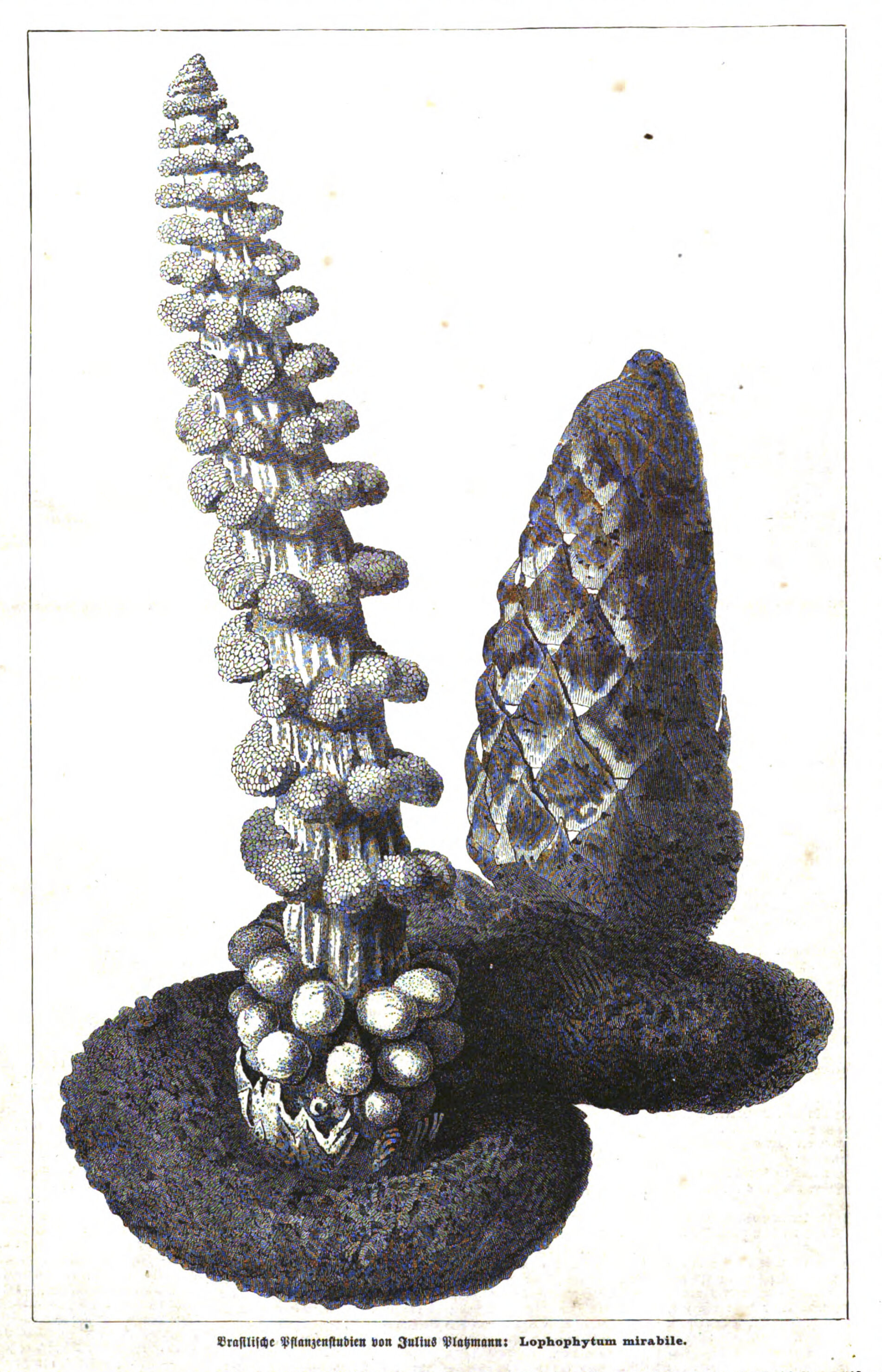
Lophophytum mirabile

Bactris setosa

=== Aus Der Bai Von Paranaguá ===
Platzmann published a travelogue of his trip in the form of a collection of letters to his parents in Germany. The work received considerable attention: it was serialized in the Dresdner Journal and described at length in Teubner's catalog of 1872. The 217-page book is structured as a series of letters to his mother and father, describing the varied landscapes, animals, and above all plants found in the Paranaguá bay. It includes a detailed map of the region:

Map from Platzmann’s 1879 book Aus der bai von Paranaguá (From the bay of Paranguá). The island where Platzmann lived, Ilha dos Pinheiros, is visible just right of center. An image of the original print (which may be an autograph work by Platzmann), see the original scan.

In a tone redolent of the romantic science popular in his day, Platzmann describes the environment of Paranaguá as both enchanting and challenging. He also describes his life among the varied inhabitants of the area, from the Swiss colony on the nearby island of Superagui Island, to a Brazilian family with whom he lived for a period and from whom he learned to speak Brazilian Portuguese. He gives detailed descriptions of some of the local plant life, of which he was making detailed botanical illustrations. Platzmann took a particular interest in bromeliads.

Platzmann republished one of the appendices of Aus der Bai von Paranaguá as a small pamphlet of the nature and culture in the coastal areas around Paranaguá. Almost uniquely among his works, it was not published by B.G. Teubner, but rather a small local press in Grimma.

== From botany to comparative linguistics ==
After his return to Germany, Platzmann was sent a copy of the explorer, botanist, and ethnographer Carl Friedrich Philipp von Martius's compilation of glossaries of many indigenous languages of Brazil. Platzmann himself recounted this event as the beginning of his shift from botany to linguistics:

After my return from Brazil, which took place in the year 1864, Mr. von Martius — who was quite delighted by my watercolors and with whom I was in correspondence — sent me, to my good fortune or misfortune, his Linguarum brasiliensium. And thus began my great, twenty-year, amateurish study of languages.

In particular, he became captivated by the idea that word relationships could be detected across New World and Old World languages. In 1871 he published his Amerikanisch-asiatische Etymologien via Behring-Strasse 'from the east to the west', which contained comparisons between New and Old world languages which he was convinced showed genetic relationships between languages around the world.

Advertisement for Platzmann's "Amerikanisch-asiatische Etymologien via Behring-Strasse". Published in the back pages of Trübner's American and Oriental literary record Vol. 3, No. 78.

His comparisons paid no heed to the comparative method, which was being developed by his contemporaries in Leipzig and beyond. There were no shortage of negative reviews — Canstatt referred to it as "a clear failure … based on dilettantish fallacies. Daniel Brinton called the etymologies "verbal coincidences" that did not "merit serious consideration". In another letter, Hugo Schuchardt criticizes "his old friend" Platzmann of having fallen prey to "the siren call of phonetic similarity", describing his "etymologizing" as "wild fantasy". Even the London notice of the publication of the work critiqued it because "the greatest caution is required for not assigning too much value to such correspondences in sound and meaning".

But once the notion of speculative etymology caught hold of Platzmann, it never let him go: he never ceased to assert that he had a unique ability to "find" etymological unities across the languages of the world. While he admitted that his early Etymologien was "hasty and premature", years later he also describes having continually worked since its publication to publish "a second, improved, and greatly enlarged edition of the American-Asiatic Etymologies."

A random sample of his proposed cognates from the work is shown below:

New World word	New World language	Old World word	Old World language
Ri	Quechua	rī	Sanskrit
Riču	Quechua	lōk	Sanskrit
Rik, right	Botocudo	right, right	English
Rima, speak	Quechua	rumor, speak	Latin
Rimay, speech	Quechua	'rēma, speech	Greek language
Ris, red	Taino	russus, red	Latin

As can be seen by the combinations of language families in this table, Platzmann allowed himself to conclude that any similarity between any word from any New World language and any word from any Old World language with a vaguely similar meaning was significant, when in fact the similarities were almost certainly due to chance.

Peetermans ascribes this work to Platzmann's belief in "the monogenetic origin of all humans and their languages" and that this belief "enabled him to gain some insight into the original human language of prehistoric times, die Sprache des Menschen 'the language of the human (being)', which is the mother tongue from which die Sprachen der Völker 'the languages of the peoples' all derive."

While Platzmann predicted that his work would be rediscovered and appreciated in the future, contemporary linguists disregarded the value of what they evaluated as irresponsible etymological fancies.

== Collecting early missionary grammars and dictionaries ==
Once he had rededicated his career to the topic of linguistic research, he quickly turned his considerable monetary resources toward building a private library of rare early grammars. He described his journey in collecting and republishing linguistic works as his "great, twenty-year, dilettante language study". His life became almost exclusively focused on acquiring and studying books in his collection, and he described himself as hermit: (Note: Aber ich bin ein Einsiedler. Laßt mir diesen meinen Stand. Ich besinne mich wohl als Einsiedler. Ich nütze meinen Mitmenschen als Einsiedler. "But I am a hermit. Leave me this, my station. I reflect well as a hermit. I benefit my fellow men as a hermit." Platzmann 1893 p.123)

I was able to read with diligence, because I never go out in company or to a club, never go to the theatre, never go to a concert, never go to a restaurant [...], never travel – with minimal exceptions –, am at home all year round, go to bed at 10 o’clock, even if I don't get up early, but I am with my cause all day long and I very much hate it when someone visits me and takes me out of my circle of thoughts. (Van Hal 2020, translation)

He spent enormous sums of money on these volumes. Vasconcellos cites a then-recent catalog listing of one work — Alonso de Molina’s dictionary of Nahuatl — as being valued at “£72 sterling”, which amounts to thousands of pounds in modern dollars, perhaps a year's salary for a laborer in those days. Platzmann himself practically bragged about the cost of his volumes: "I spared no expense. I have repeatedly paid 1000, 2000, even 5000 francs for a book."

Platzmann published a catalog of his collection as of 1876, when it contained exclusively volumes related to American languages. The importance of this library was recognized by influential contemporaries, among them August Friedrich Pott, who called them "an enviable treasure of the highest value and a unique private possession of its kind". Brinton also praised the work, calling it "a model of this kind of bibliographical work". It was these books that would become the basis of his later facsimile editions.

By the time of his death in 1902, his library had grown to include 1400 volumes. A catalog of the auction of that library was published by Oswald Weigel.

In some cases Platzmann commissioned private copies of manuscripts for himself or for others. One amanuensis for these transcriptions was Emanuel Forchhammer, who copied a rare manuscript grammar of the Chiquitano language of Bolivia, which was later used as a source in a published grammar of the language. Forchhammer also transcribed the so-called Gülich manuscript, a collectanea of content about Tupi, for Karl Friederich Henning, the personal secretary and tutor for Pedro II of Brazil, with whom Platzmann was personally acquainted.

== Facsimile editions ==
This map shows the breadth of distribution of the series of facsimiles of linguistic works created by Julius Platzmann. The set of facsimiles produced by Platzmann cover languages from all over South America (as well as Nahuatl in Mexico.)

Later in his life, Platzmann published facsimiles of his collected books, beginning in 1874 with a facsimile of the Tupi grammar of 1595 by the Jesuit José de Anchieta. Facsimile editions of historical South American language books followed and eventually included the Carib, Arawak, Tupi, Guarani, Araucano, Quechua, Aymara, Mapudungun, Cumanagoto, Kariri, Arawak, Abipón, Tehuelche, Moxa, and Lingua Geral languages. one facsimile, of Molino's famous Nahuatl (Aztec) dictionary, was from North America.

The exceptional fidelity of the facsimiles is demonstrated below by two sample pages from Ludovico Bertonio's vocabulary of the Aymara language. On the left is the original, and a scan of the same page in Platzmann's facsimile is on the right.

Page 22, Bertonio original	Platzmann's facsimile, page 22
Page 22, Bertonio original	Platzmann's facsimile

Van Hal makes the case that it was the well-known German linguist August Pott who encouraged Platzmann to continue creating facsimiles, knowing that Platzmann was both obsessive enough to carry out the tedious work, and wealthy enough to afford to purchase exceedingly rare and valuable originals.

As for the facsimiles themselves, it is clear that Platzmann held that the early grammars should not be modified at all:

I prefer the old American grammars as they are. No one should try to correct them, for it is impossible. One couldn't improve a Raphael or a Rembrandt. They are masterpieces from a bygone era that should remain as they are.

The Austrian comparativist linguist Friedrich Müller considered Platzmann's exact facsimiles as superior to the more common strategy of newly typeset editions. In a review of Platzmann's 1892 facsimile edition of Raymond Breton's 1666 dictionary of the Kalinago language (Island Carib), Müller asserts that such facsimiles were less likely than reprints to introduce new typographic errors, and thereby made the original rare works "entirely superfluous".

All of Platzmann's facsimiles were printed and published by B. G. Teubner. The table below is a complete list of his facsimile editions, based mainly on Van Hal (2020).

=== Table of Facsimiles ===
Year of Facsimile	Year of Original Work	Author	Facsimile	Description	Language
1874	1595	José de Anchieta (1534–1597)	Arte de Gramática da Língua mais Usada na Costa do Brasil	Art of Grammar of the Most Used Language on the Coast of Brazil (reprint)	Tupi
1876	1595	José de Anchieta (1534–1597)	Arte de grammatica da lingua mais usada na costa do Brasil feita pelo P. Joseph de Anchieta	Arte de Grammatica da Lingoa Mais Usada na Costa do Brasil. Feita pelo P. Joseph de Anchieta. Publicada por Julio Platzmann (Grammar of the Most Used Language on the Coast of Brazil Made by Father Joseph de Anchieta. Published by Julio Platzmann (facsimile edition)	Tupi
1876	1640	Antonio Ruiz de Montoya (1585–1652)	Arte, Bocabulario, Tesoro y Catecismo de la lengva gvarani por Antonio Ruiz de Montoya. 4 vols.	Art, Vocabulary, Treasure and Catechism of the Guarani Language by Antonio Ruiz de Montoya. 4 vols.	Guarani
1878	1687	Luís Figueira (1573–1643)	A Arte da Língua Brasílica	Grammar of the Language of Brazil	Tupi
1878	1686	Antônio de Araújo (1566–1632)	Catecismo brasilico da doutrina christãa	Brazilian (Tupi) Catechism of Christian Doctrine	Tupi
1879	1612	Ludovico Bertonio (1555–1628)	Arte de la lengua aymara compuesta por el P. Ludovico Bertonio	Art of the Aymara Language Composed by Father Ludovico Bertonio	Aymara
1879	1612	Ludovico Bertonio (1555–1628)	Vocabulario de la lengua aymara compuesto por el P. Ludovico Bertonio. 2 vols	Vocabulary of the Aymara Language Composed by Father Ludovico Bertonio. 2 vols.	Aymara
1880	1571	Alonso de Molina (1513?–1585?)	Vocabulario de la lengua méxicana compuesto por el P. Fr. Alonso de Molina	Vocabulary of the Mexican Language Composed by Father Alonso de Molina	Mexican (Nahuatl)
1883	1777	Bernhard Havestadt (1714–1781)	Chilidúgu, sive, Tractatus linguae chilensis, opera Bernardi Havestadt	Chilidúgu, or, Treatise on the Chilean Language, Work of Bernardi Havestadt	Mapudungun/Chilean
1887	1606	Luis de Valdivia (1561–1642)	Arte, Vocabulario y Confesionario de la lengua de Chile, compuestos por Luiz de Valdivia	Art, Vocabulary and Confessionary of the Language of Chile, Composed by Luiz de Valdivia	Mapudungun/Chilean
1888		Francisco de Tauste, Matías Ruiz Blanco, Diego de Tapia, Manuel de Yangues	Algunas obras raras sobre la lengua cumanagota	Some Rare Works on the Cumanagota Language [5 vols.]	Cumanagoto
1888	1680	Francisco de Tausté (1626–1685)	Vol. 1: Arte, Bocabulario, Doctrina christiana, y Catecismo de la lengua de Cumana, compuestos por el R. P. Fr. Francisco de Tausté	Vol. 1: Art, Vocabulary, Christian Doctrine, and Catechism of the Language of Cumana, Composed by Father Francisco de Tausté	Cumanagoto
1888		Manuel de Yangues (d. 1676)	Vol. 2: Principios y reglas de la lengua Cumanagota, c. un diccionario	Vol. 2: Principles and Rules of the Cumanagota Language, with a Dictionary	Cumanagoto
1888		Matías Ruiz Blanco (1643–1705)	Vol. 3: Arte y tesoro de la lengua Cumanagota [Matías Ruiz Blanco, 1643–1705]	Vol. 3: Art and Treasure of the Cumanagota Language	Cumanagoto
1888		Diego de Tapía (fl. 1746)	Vol. 4-5: Confesionario mas lato en lengua cumanagota por fr. Diego de Tapía	Vol. 4-5: Extended Confessionary in the Cumanagota Language by fr. Diego de Tapía	Cumanagoto
1890	1778	Anselm Eckart (1721–1809)	Specimen linguae brasilicae vulgaris	Anselm Eckart's Specimen of the Common Brazilian Language, published by Christoph Gottlieb von Murr.	Tupi
1891	1560	Domingo de Santo Tomás (1499–1570)	Arte de la lengua quichua compuesto por Domingo de Sancto Thomas; Publicada de nuevo por Julio Platzmann; Edición facsimilar	Grammatica, o arte de la lengua general de los Indios de los Reynos del Perú. Nueuamente compuelta, por el Maestro fray Domingo de. S. Thomas, Dela orden de. S. Domingo, Morador en los dichos Reynos.	Quechua
1900	1666	Raymond Breton (1609–1679)	Dictionaire caraibe-français and Dictionaire français-caraibe	Carib-French and French-Carib Dictionaries Composed by Father Raymond Breton	Carib
1894	1701	Pedro Marbán (1653–1713)	Arte de la lengua Moxa con su vocabulario y cathecismo por el padre Pedro Marban	Art of the Moxa Language with its Vocabulary and Catechism by Father Pedro Marban	Moxa
1896	1795	Anonymous	O diccionario anonymo da lingua geral do Brasil publicado de novo com o seu reverso por Julio Platzmann	The Anonymous Dictionary of the General Language of Brazil newly published with reverse by Julio Platzmann Based on the Lisbon edition of 1795.	Língua Geral
1896	1709	Bernardo de Nantes	Catecismo da lingua kariris composto pelo R. P. Fr. Bernardo de Nantes	Catechism of the Kariri Language Composed by Father Bernardo de Nantes	Kariri
1898	1639	Antonio Ruiz de Montoya (1585–1652)	Tesoro de la lengua guarani	Treasury of the Guarani Language	Guarani
1899	1775	Thomas Falkner (1707–1784)	Thomas Falkner's Nachricht von der moluchischen Sprache, separat und unverändert herausgegeben von Julius Platzmann mit einer Karte.	Thomas Falkner's Account of the Moluchian Language, published separated and unchanged by Julius Platzmann with a Map. A short (22pp) reprint of a German translation of a collectanea of English language materials on Mapudungun by Thomas Falkner.	Mapudungun
1900	1807	Christlieb Quandt (1740–1824)	Des Herrnhuter Glaubensboten Christlieb Quandt nachricht von der Arawackischen Sprache	The Herrnhut Missionary Christlieb Quandt's Account of the Arawak Language. Brief reprint (22 pages) of linguistic material from the Moravian missionary Christlieb Quandt's original book on Suriname.	Arawak (Lokono)
1902	1783	Martin Dobrizhoffer (1717–1791)	Auskunft über die Abiponische Sprache	An account of the Abipón language. Platzmann reprinted the linguistic material from the German translation of the Latin original Historia de Abiponibus, equestri bellicosaque Paraquariae natione	Abipón
1903		Theophilus Schmidt (fl. 1860)	Der Sprachstoff der Patagonischen Grammatik des Theophilus Schmidt. Mit einer Karte des südlichen Südamerika	The Language Material of the Patagonian Grammar by Theophilus Schmidt. With a Map of Southern South America	Patagonian/Tehuelche

Fully a third of these publications deal with the Tupi–Guarani languages, reflecting Platzmann’s particular interest in the languages of Brazil.

== Autobiography ==
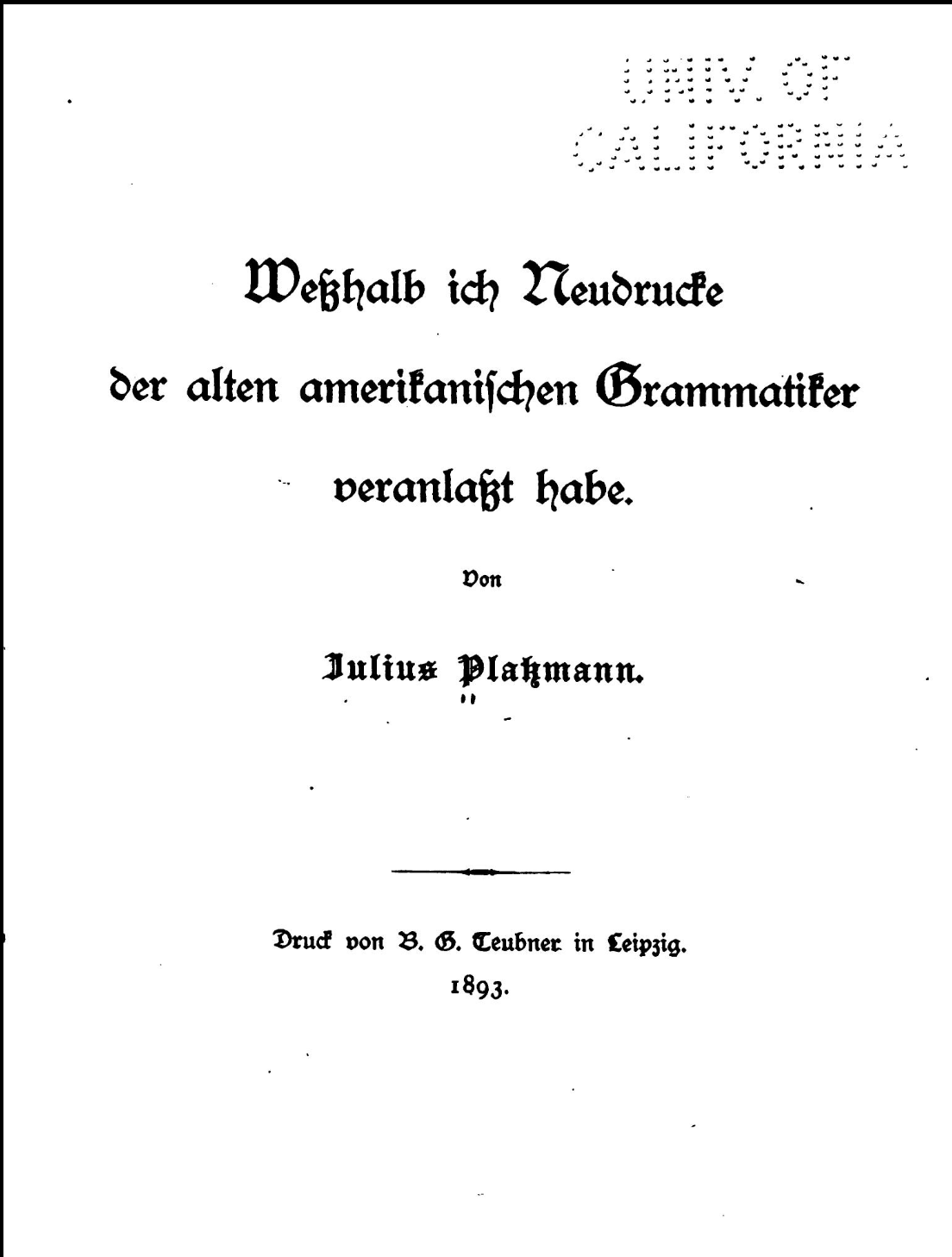
Cover page of Julius Platzmann's "Why I republished old American grammars"

Platzmann dedicated a work to the topic of why he created facsimiles (among many meandering asides), the 1893 Weßhalb ich Neudrucke der alten amerikanischen Grammatiker veranlaßt habe ("Why I published new editions of the old American Grammars"). despite the specific title, the work is more of a memoir or autobiography than an explanation of his facsimile work. As usual in Platzmann's work, it includes many meandering asides into speculative Old/New world etymological relationships, as well as his musings about how to rethink print alphabets.

In a private letter to Alice Cunningham Fletcher, the American linguist Daniel Brinton described this kind of work by Platzmann as “cranky”:

I have just been reading Julius Platzmann's autobiographical pamphlet in which he explains why he republished so many Americana. The reason was, he wanted to prove that the Amer. langs. (all of them) are substantially the same as the Aryan, Semitic, African & Chinese tongues! He gives many examples of verbal identity. Such cranky productions are either sad or humorous, as you choose to take them. If I hear of any good article on the subject, I shall acquaint you with it.

Elsewhere Brinton lumps Platzmann's etymological works in with those of other poorly supported linguistic claims in works by Émile Petitot, Francisco Adolfo de Varnhagen, and others.

Albert Gatschet was more forgiving in his 1894 review of the work, opining that "Although many of his readers may disagree from him on etymological topics, we are always ready to hear what a scientist of world-wide travel and of much literary experience has to state about the work that he has made the purpose of his life."

== Derivative works ==
He also wrote four derivative works, some based the sources of his facsimiles (Anchieta, Figueira, Anonymous), and one on a bible translation.

- 1874 - Grammatik der brasilianischen Sprache, mit Zugrundelegung des Anchieta. - A German-language outline of the contents of Anchieta’s grammar of Old Tupi.
- 1882 - Glossar der Feuerländischen Sprache. - A vocabulary of the Yahgan language of Tierra del Fuego. It is derived from Thomas Bridges' translation of the Gospel of St. Luke, published in London in 1881.
- 1899 - Der Sprachstoff Der Brasilianischen Grammatik Des Luis Figueira von Julius Platzmann und Luis Figueira. - Like his 1874 summary of Anchieta, this is an overview in German on Figueira's grammar of the same language.
- 1901 - Das anonyme wörterbuch tupi-deutsch und deutsch-tupi. Mit einer Karte des amazonenstromes (The Anonymous Dictionary Tupi-German and German-Tupi. With a Map of the Amazon River). A German-language "remodeling" of Platzmann's 1896 facsimile of a 1795 printing edited by José Mariano de Conceição Vellozo.

== Legacy ==
Charles Jacques Édouard Morren named the species Vriesea platzmannii in Platzmann's honor.

A portrait from an obituary of Platzmann from Grimmatisches ECCE, a publication of the school he attended as a child.

Platzmann was elected as a member to the American Philosophical Society in 1886, and awarded a medal from the Société américaine de France in 1875.

Unsold stocks of Platzmann’s facsimiles (they had sold poorly) were purchased en masse from Teubner and subsequently sold by Otto Harrassowitz.

Platzmann’s personal library was auctioned off by Oswald Weigel in 1903.

Weigel enumerates three awards received by Platzmann, among "many more":

- Imperial Brazilian Order of the Rose - Chivalric award of the Empire of Brazil, Platzmann was awarded the rank of "knight" (cavaleiro)
- Albert Order - Kingdom of Saxony
- Ehrenzeichen für Kunst und Wissenschaft - Austro-Hungarian Empire

Of his legacy, Grumpelt comments:

Julius Platzmann lived a quiet and withdrawn life, devoting himself solely to the serious study of linguistics, making the rare treasures of linguistics available to the public through reprints, and collecting documents of human speech in all its diversity.

Portrait of Julius Platzmann from obituary by Carl Alexander Grumpelt, Zeitschrift für Bücherfreunde 77

Despite his harsh critique of Platzmann's comparative efforts cited above, Daniel Brinton gave very high praise for Platzmann's work on facsimiles:

By his beautiful and faithful republications of old authors he has, perhaps, done more than any other living man to aid these studies.
