= Pedro Marbán =

Jesuit missionary from Spain (1653–1713)

- Born: January 7, 1653; Tiedra, Spanish Empire
- Died: November 13, 1713 (aged 60); Loreto, Real Audiencia de Charcas, Spanish Empire

Pedro Marbán (Tiedra, January 8, 1653 - Loreto, November 28, 1713) was a Jesuit missionary and founder of several missions among the Mojeño people of Bolivia. The province of Marbán in the Bolivian province of Beni is named after him.

== Early life and education ==
Pedro Marbán was born in Tiedra in what is now the Valladolid province of Spain on January 8, 1653. Marbán lost his mother at an early age, and was taken in by an aunt. His father sent him to study in Villagarcía and after he completed his studies in the humanities, sent him to Salamanca, where some of his relatives lived. There he decided to join the Jesuits and after being accepted he moved to the Novitiate in Villagarcía. He studied the arts in Soria and then was sent to Bilbao to teach grammar. Afterwards he completed his education in Valladolid. He then requested to be sent to the Americas. In his fourth year, Juan de Ribadeneira arrived in Spain in the role of procurator and he called Marbán to Seville, where the expedition was planned.

== Journey to the Americas ==
From Lima, he was sent to Santa Cruz de la Sierra, in the Real Audiencia de Charcas, Bolivia, together with father Cipriano Barace and José del Castillo. In 1675, the three missionaries began their journey to the Mamoré river in Llanos de Moxos. In May 1675, the missionaries arrived at the port of the Guapay river (modern Río Grande, to the east of Santa Cruz de la Sierra. There they found canoes made by the Mojeños, but they decided not to use them due to their fragility. José del Castillo, together with a Mojeño interpreter, traveled in search of better canoes and they managed to convince Mojeño leaders to receive the Jesuits, and they organized a flotilla of rowers. They arrived to the port in June, which permitted Marbán and company to continue their evangelization efforts.

== Missionary work in Moxos ==
At the end of 1675, Marbán and company embarked on the Guapay river and began their journey up the Mamoré river. After eleven days they reached the first Mojeño settlement, marking the beginning of their missionary work in Llanos de Moxos. There they managed to contact the Maremonos, one of many Mojeños peoples. The difficult and long journey culminated in the founding of the town of Nuestra Señora de Loreto on March 25, 1682, the first Jesuit Mission among the Moxos. The Jesuits introduced the first 86 head of cattle in Moxos, as an effort to develop the region, with the support of the Maremonos.

== Leadership of Moxos mission ==
Marbán was designated as the superior at the mission from 1681 to 1700. During his administration ten reducciones (indigenous settlements for the purpose of religious conversion) to the west of the Mamoré River. He was an active participant in teaching skills such as the construction of violins, masonry, tailoring and showmaking. He also incorporated both Spanish and Mojeño cultural traditions when composing religious songs in Latin, Spanish, and the Mojeño language.

== Linguistic work ==
Arte de la lengua moxa, - con su vocabulario, y cathecismo 1701.

In 1701 he wrote the Arte de la lengua moxa, con su vocabulario y cathecismo (Grammar of the Moxa language, with a vocabulary and catechism). A facsimile reprint by Julius Platzmann was printed in Leipzig in 1895. It is one of the earliest descriptive works of an Arawakan language.

The book was included in the Memory of the World Programme in 2023.

== Death ==
After more than three decades living in the Moxos region, he died in Loreto in 1713.

== See also ==
- Cipriano Barace
- Gobierno político y militar de Moxos
- Misiones jesuíticas de Moxos
- Misiones jesuitas de Chiquitos
- Baures
- Itonamas
