= Marbán Province =

Coordinates: 15.333°S 64.500°W

Marbán
- Province
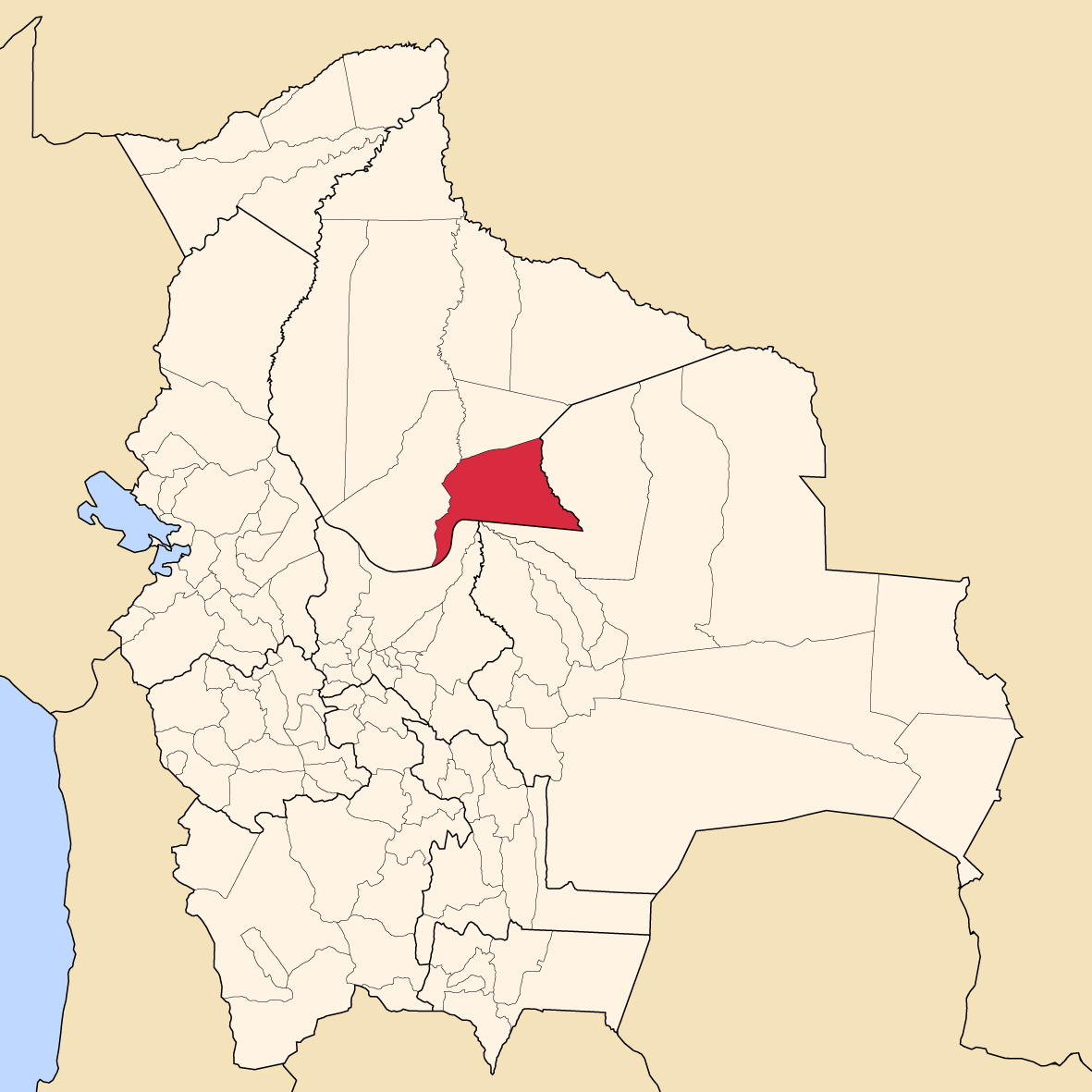
- Map of Bolivia highlighting the province of Marbán.

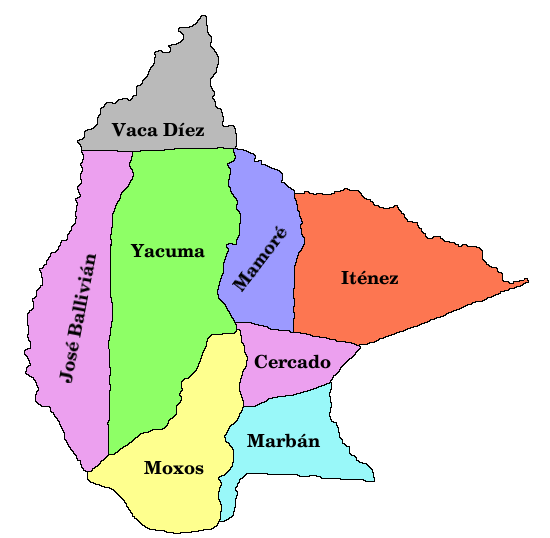
- Provinces of the Beni Department
- Country: Bolivia
- Department: Beni
- Seat: Loreto
- Settlements: Municipalities: Loreto; San Andrés

Area
  - Total: 5,840 sq mi (15,126 km^{2})

Population (2024 census)
  - Total: 19,898
  - Density: 3.4071/sq mi (1.3155/km^{2})
- Time zone: UTC-4 (BOT)

Marbán is a province in the Beni Department, Bolivia. The capital is Loreto. It was named after the Jesuit missionary Pedro Marbán.

== Places of interest ==
- Cachimbo Lake
- San Jorge Lake
- Isiboro Sécure National Park and Indigenous Territory
