= Ludovico Bertonio =

Italian Jesuit missionary (1552–1625)

Ludovico Bertonio (1552 in Rocca Contrada – 3 August 1625 in Lima) was an Italian Jesuit missionary to South America.

== Life ==
He entered the Society of Jesus in 1575. Sent to Peru six years later, he worked principally among the Aymara of southern Peru and of Bolivia.

== Work ==
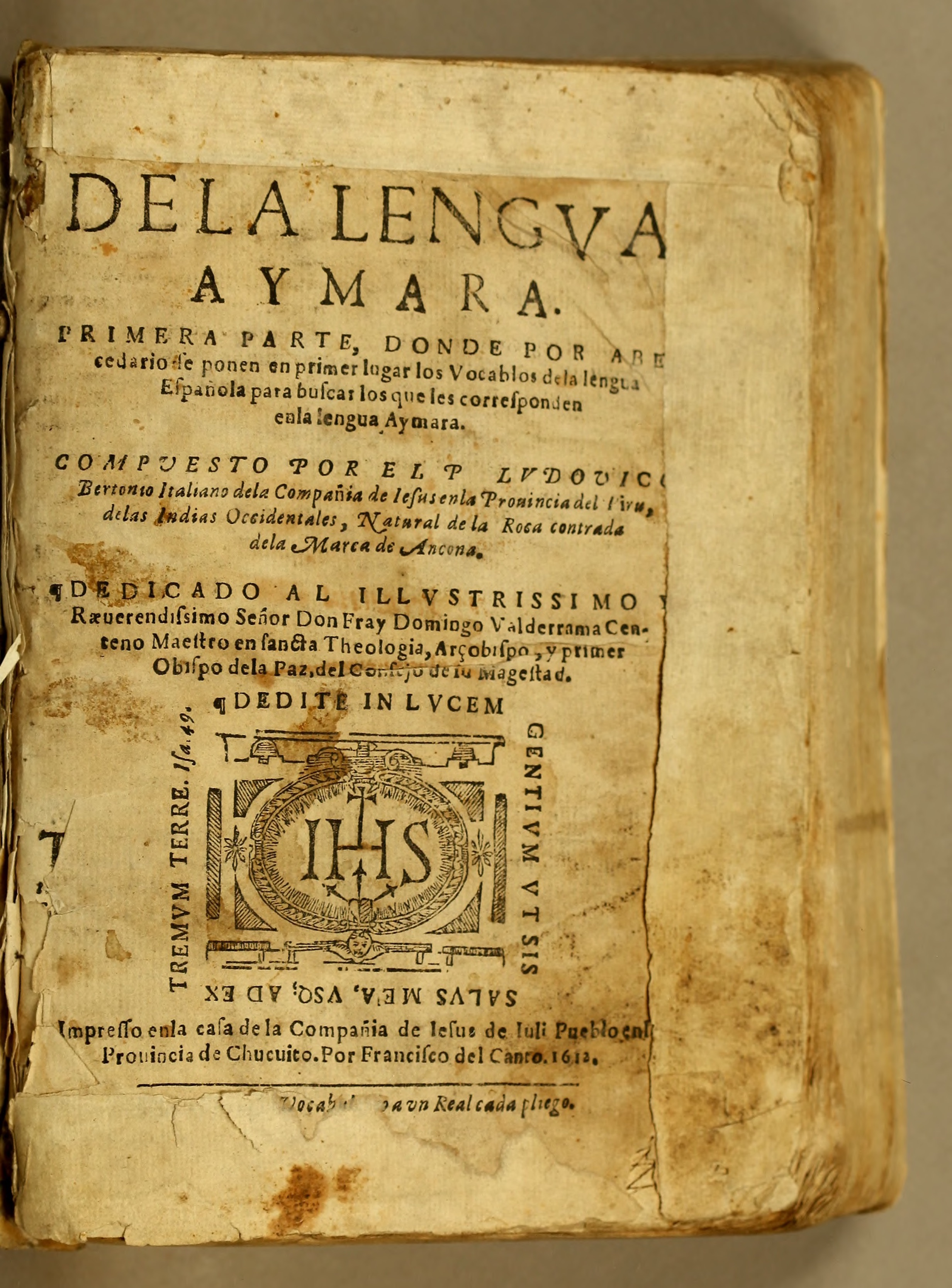
Title page, Vocabulario de la lengua aymara, 1612

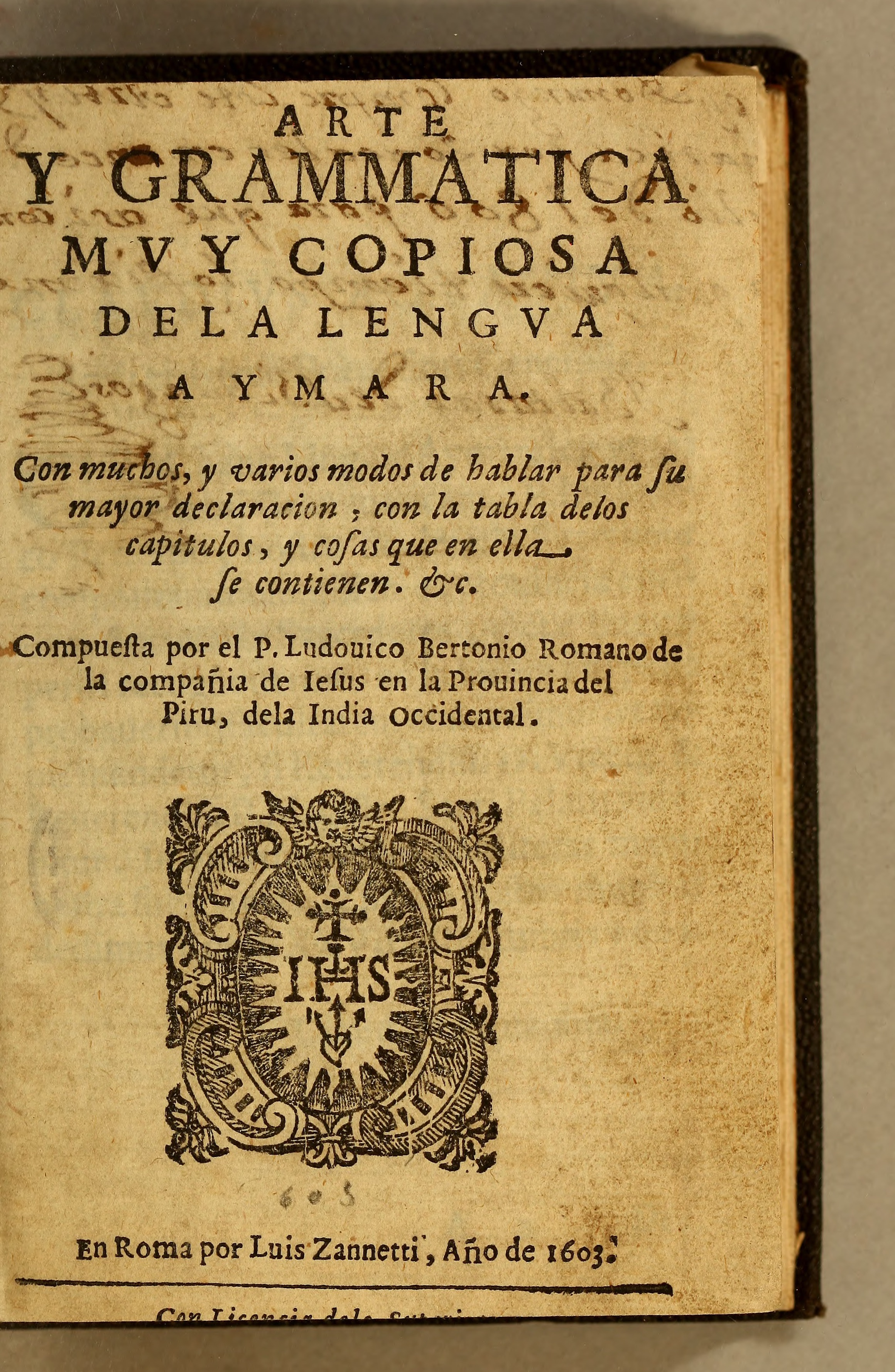
Title page, Arte y grammatica muy copiosa de la lengua aymara, 1603

He wrote on the Aymara language. His earliest publications appeared under the title Arte breve de la lengua aymara para introducir el Arte grande de la misma lengua (Rome, 1603), also Arte y gramatica muy copiosa de la lengua aymara etc.

The printing press having been introduced and established by the Jesuits at the Indian mission of Juli in southwestern Peru, Bertonio had the following works printed there, including four in the year 1612 alone:

- Arte y Grammatica muy copiosa de la Lengua Aymara (1603)
- Arte Breve de la Lengua Aymara para Introducción del Arte Grande de la misma Lengua (1603)
- Vocabulario de la Lengua Aymara (1612)
- Arte de la Lengua Aymara. Con una Silva de Phrases de la misma lengua y declaracion en Romance (1612)
- Libro de la Vida y Milagros de Nuestro Señor Iesu Christo en dos Lenguas. Aymara y Romance (1612)
- Confessionario muy copioso en dos lenguas Aymara y Española, con una instrucción a cerca de los Siete Sacramentos de la Sancta Yglesia y otras varias cosas (1612)

The publications by Bertonio are rare. Julius Platzmann published in facsimile the Arte y grammatica of 1603 and the Vocabularies. The Peruvian historian Clemente Markham claimed that Bertonio invented the name "Aymara"; the Bolivian geographer Manuel Vicente Ballivian rejected this in a pamphlet.
