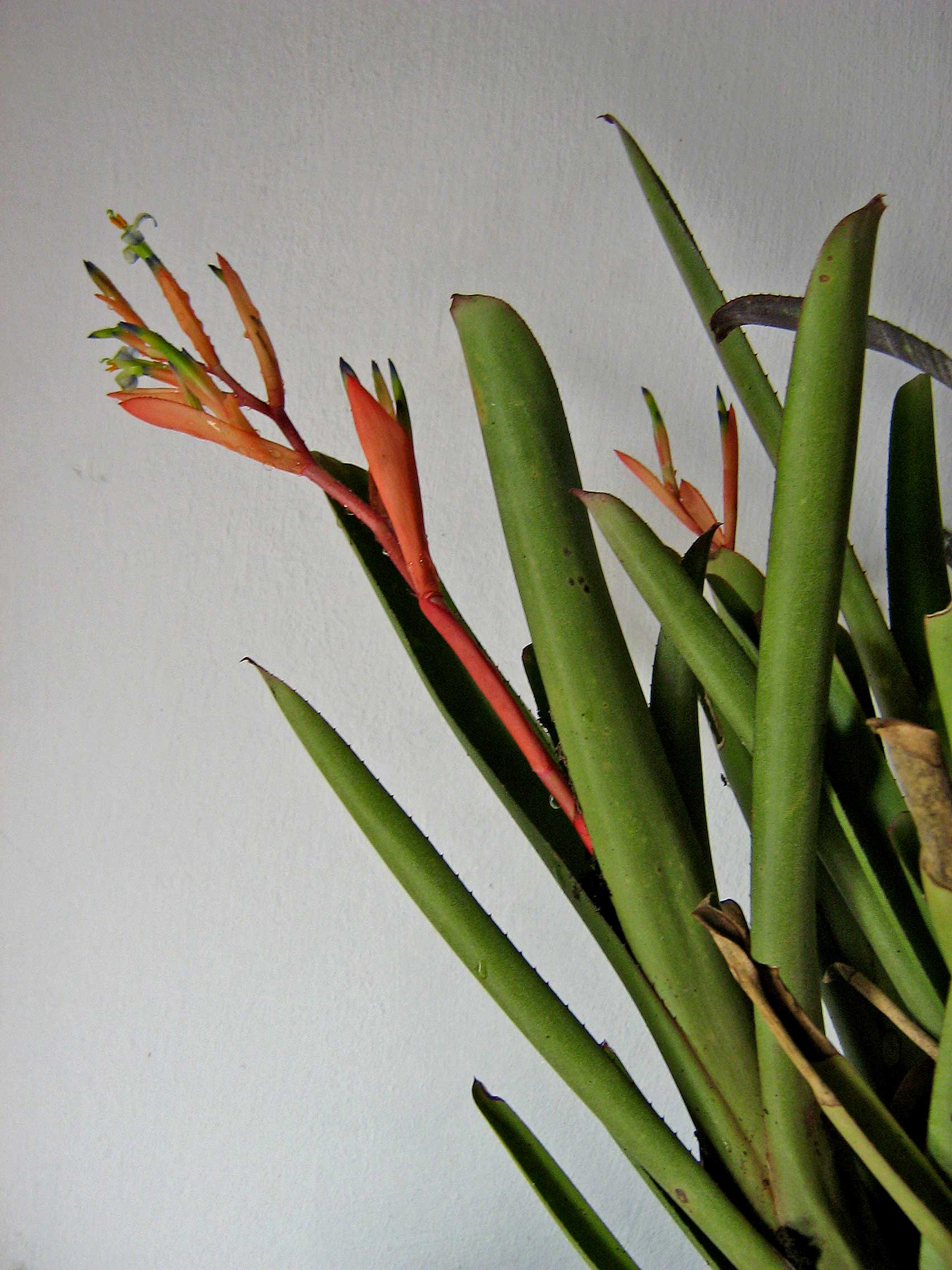

Scientific classification
- Kingdom: Plantae
- Clade: Tracheophytes
- Clade: Angiosperms
- Clade: Monocots
- Clade: Commelinids
- Order: Poales
- Family: Bromeliaceae
- Genus: Billbergia
- Subgenus: Billbergia subg. Billbergia
- Species: B. amoena

Binomial name
- Billbergia amoena (G.Lodd.) Lindl.

Synonyms
- Tillandsia amoena G.Lodd.; Bromelia pallida Ker Gawl.; Billbergia speciosa Thunb.; Pitcairnia discolor Loisel.; Pourretia magnispatha Colla; Tillandsia variegata Vell.; Bromelia laevis Schult. & Schult.f.; Billbergia chlorocyanea de Vriese; Billbergia discolor (Loisel.) Beer; Billbergia pallescens K.Koch & C.D.Bouché; Billbergia pallida (Ker Gawl.) Beer; Billbergia binotii R.C.J.Gerard; Billbergia wiotiana De Jonghe ex Mez; Billbergia wacketii Mez

= Billbergia amoena =

Species of flowering plant

Billbergia amoena is a plant species in the genus Billbergia. This species is endemic to Brazil but widely cultivated elsewhere as an ornamental.

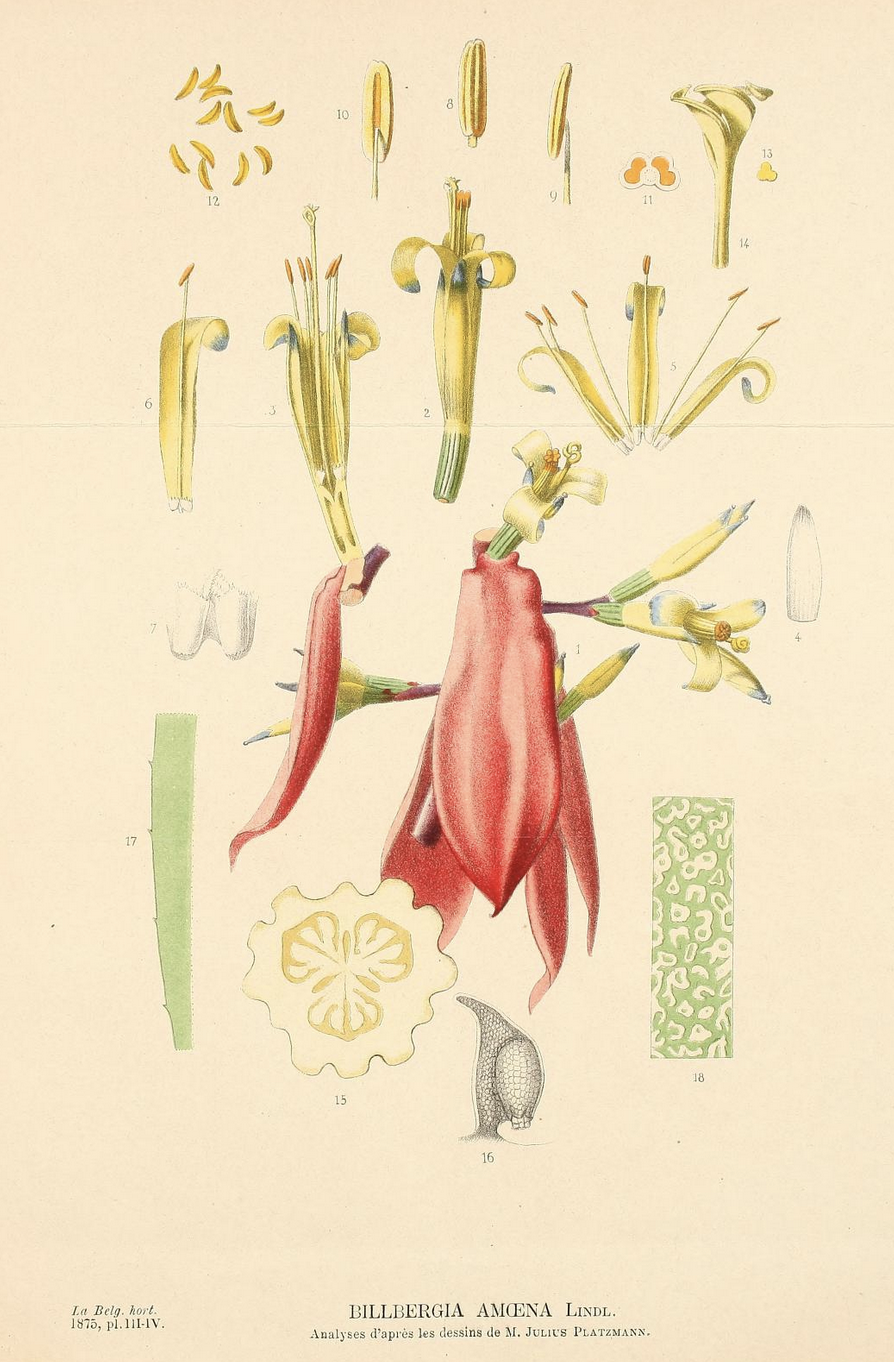
Billbergia amoena, print based on drawings by Julius Platzmann
