= Vriesea platzmannii =

Scientific classification
- Kingdom: Plantae
- Clade: Tracheophytes
- Clade: Angiosperms
- Clade: Monocots
- Clade: Commelinids
- Order: Poales
- Family: Bromeliaceae
- Genus: Vriesea
- Species: V. platzmannii

Binomial name
- Vriesea platzmannii E.Morren

Species of flowering plant

Vriesea platzmannii is a species of Bromeliad in the genus Vriesea. This species is endemic to Brazil.

It was named for German scholar Julius Platzmann, who discovered it. It was described in 1875 by Édouard Morren.
