= Loreto Municipality, Beni =

Loreto Municipality
- Municipality
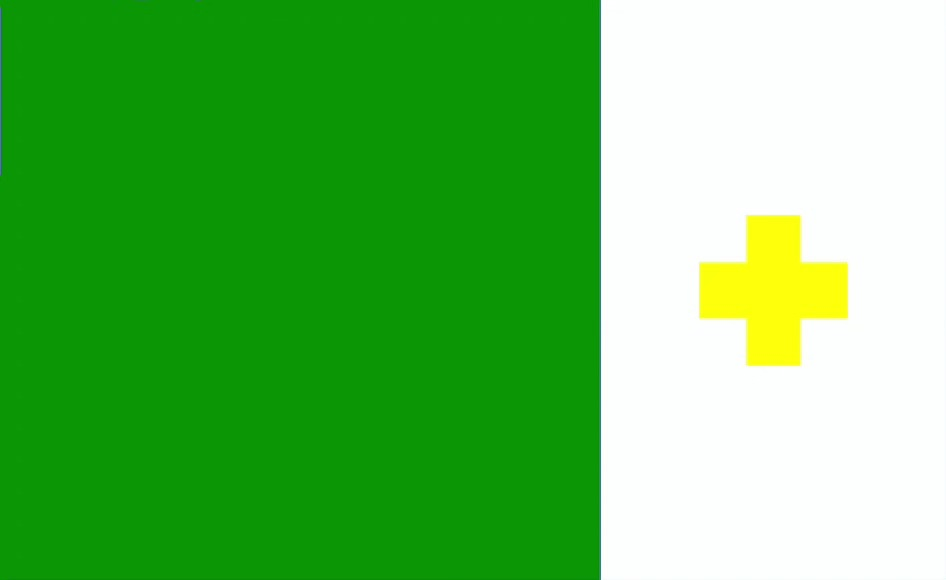
- Flag

- Location within Bolivia
- Coordinates: 15°28′S 64°54′W
- Country: Bolivia
- Department: Beni Department
- Province: Marbán Province
- Seat: Loreto

Area
  - Total: 2,607 sq mi (6,751 km^{2})
- Elevation: 560 ft (170 m)

Population (2010)
  - Total: 3,787
- Time zone: UTC-4 (BOT)

Loreto Municipality is a municipality of the Marbán Province in the Beni Department in Bolivia. Its seat is Loreto.

== See also ==
- Isiboro Sécure National Park and Indigenous Territory
