= Llanos de Moxos =

Ecoregion in Bolivia

Llanos de Moxos Beni savanna
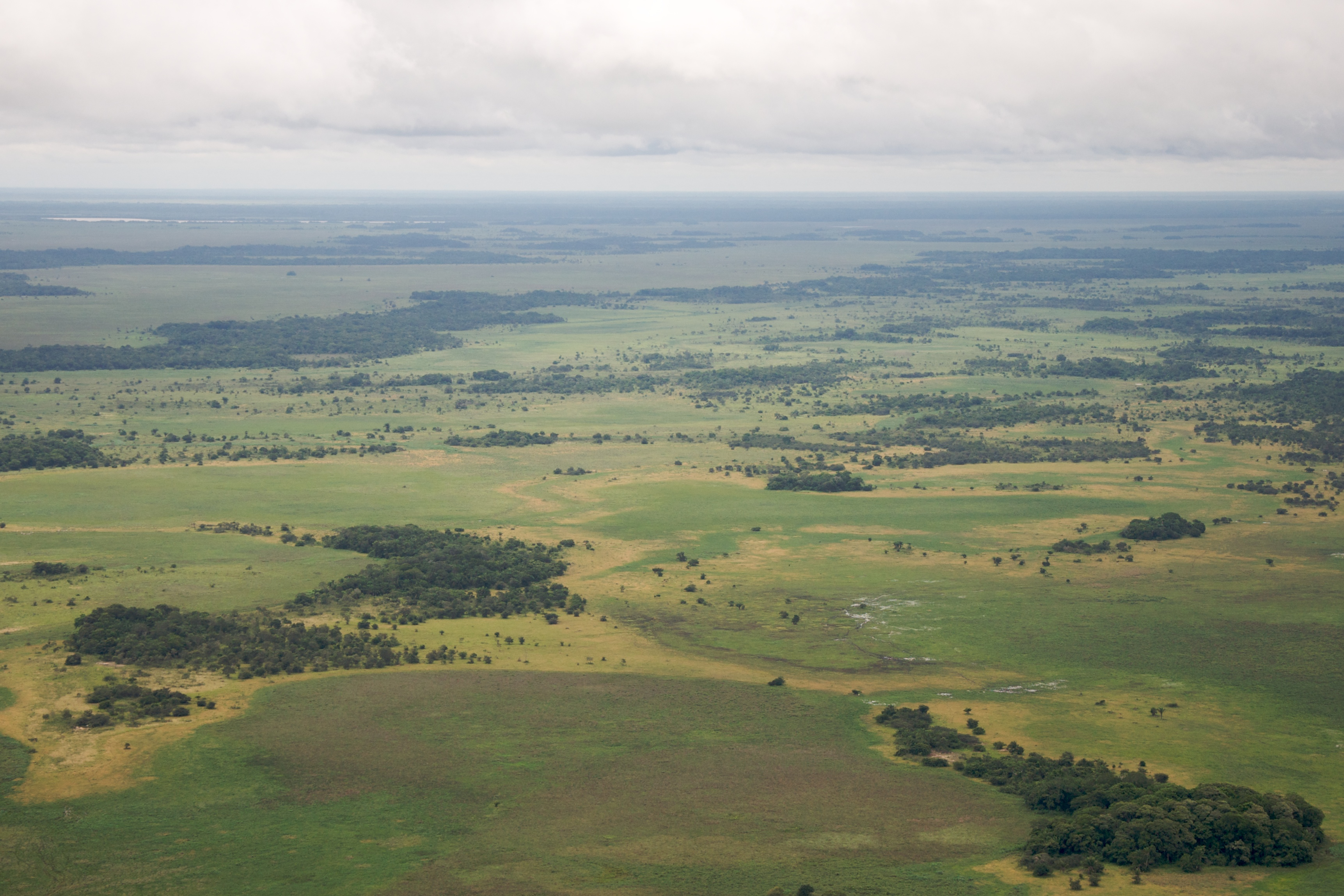

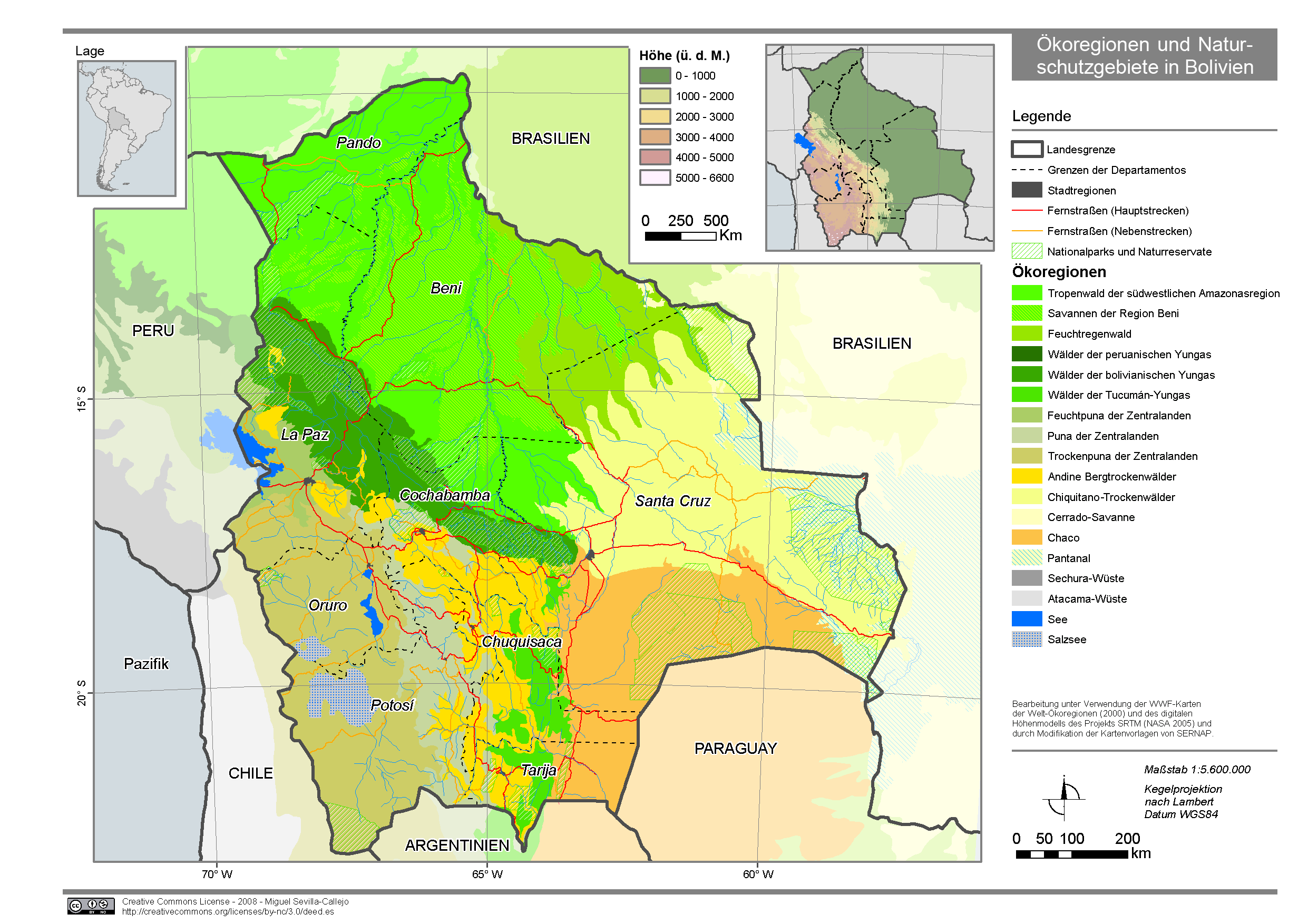
- Map of Bolivia's ecoregions. The Beni savanna is hatched bright green.

Ecology
- Realm: Neotropical
- Biome: tropical and subtropical grasslands, savannas, and shrublands
- Borders: Madeira-Tapajós moist forests; Southwest Amazon moist forests

Geography
- Area: 125,590 km^{2} (48,490 mi^{2})
- Countries: Bolivia; Brazil; Peru
- Departments: Beni

Conservation
- Conservation status: Critical/endangered
- Protected: 96,126 km^{2} (77%)

The Llanos de Moxos, also known as the Beni savanna or Moxos plains, is a tropical savanna ecoregion of the Beni Department of northern Bolivia.

== Setting ==
The Llanos de Moxos covers an area of 126,100 square kilometers (48,700 sq mi) in the lowlands of northern Bolivia, with small portions in neighboring Brazil and Peru. Most of the Llanos de Moxos lies within the departments of El Beni, Cochabamba, La Paz, Pando, and Santa Cruz. The Llanos de Moxos occupies the southwestern corner of the Amazon basin, and the region is crossed by numerous rivers that drain the eastern slope of the Andes Mountains. The low relief of the savannas, coupled with wet season rains and snowmelt from the Andes, causes up to half the land to flood seasonally.

The Llanos de Moxos is surrounded by tropical moist forests; the Southwestern Amazonian moist forests to the north, west, and south, and the Madeira-Tapajós moist forests to the east.

=== Climate ===
The climate of the Llanos de Moxos is tropical, with pronounced wet and dry seasons. The wet season generally extends from December to May, and annual rainfall ranges from 1300 mm in the east to 2500 mm in the west.

== Flora ==
The ecoregion comprises a mosaic of savannas and wetlands, with islands of forest and gallery forests along rivers. Flooding and fire are important ecological factors.

== Fauna ==
The ecoregion is home to the blue-throated macaw (Ara glaucogularis), which is critically endangered.

== People ==
The Llanos de Moxos was the setting for pre-Columbian agriculture, and appears to have been an early center of plant domestication. The inhabitants constructed agricultural earthworks: raised fields, causeways, canals, and about 4700 forested mounds over a 50,000 square kilometer area. Construction lasted from about 8850 BCE to about 1450 CE. Cultivation included manioc from about 8350 BCE, squash from about 8250 BCE, and maize from about 4,850 BCE. Several domestic crops, including manioc, squash, peanut, some varieties of chili and some beans, are genetically very close to wild species living in the Llanos de Moxos, suggesting that they were domesticated there. The people made decorated pottery, wove cotton cloth, and in some places buried their dead in large urns.

The Casarabe culture existed in the Llanos de Moxos region from approximately 400 to 1400 CE, during which time it established extensive settlements. The reasons for the decline of this culture remain unclear, although environmental changes may have played a role.

Although Europeans arrived in South America in the late 15th century, they did not come to settle in the Llanos de Moxos until the late 17th century. The missions established by Jesuit missionaries in the 17th and 18th centuries became many of the modern towns in the region.

Since the 1950s, ranching has become the most important industry, and ranches dominate the landscape.

== Jesuit Missions of Moxos ==
European immigrants began to settle in the Llanos de Moxos in the 17th century. In 1675 the Jesuit priests Pedro Marbán and Cirpriano Barace began missionary work among the peoples they found in between the Marmoré and Guapay rivers, after having departed from Santa Cruz de la Sierra. The Jesuit Missions of Moxos are located in the Llanos de Moxos, while the Jesuit Missions of Chiquitos are in the Chiquitania region to the southeast.

== Conservation and threats ==
In 2013, the Ramsar Convention designated Llanos de Moxos as a protected wetland – the largest protected area in the world at the time.

A 2017 assessment found that 96,126 km^{2}, or 77%, of the ecoregion is in protected areas.

== See also ==
- Chiquitania
- Jesuit Missions of Chiquitos
- 1491: New Revelations of the Americas Before Columbus
- Mamoré–Guaporé linguistic area
- List of lakes in Beni Department
