= Cipriano Barace =

Spanish Jesuit, missionary and martyr

Father Cipriano Barace
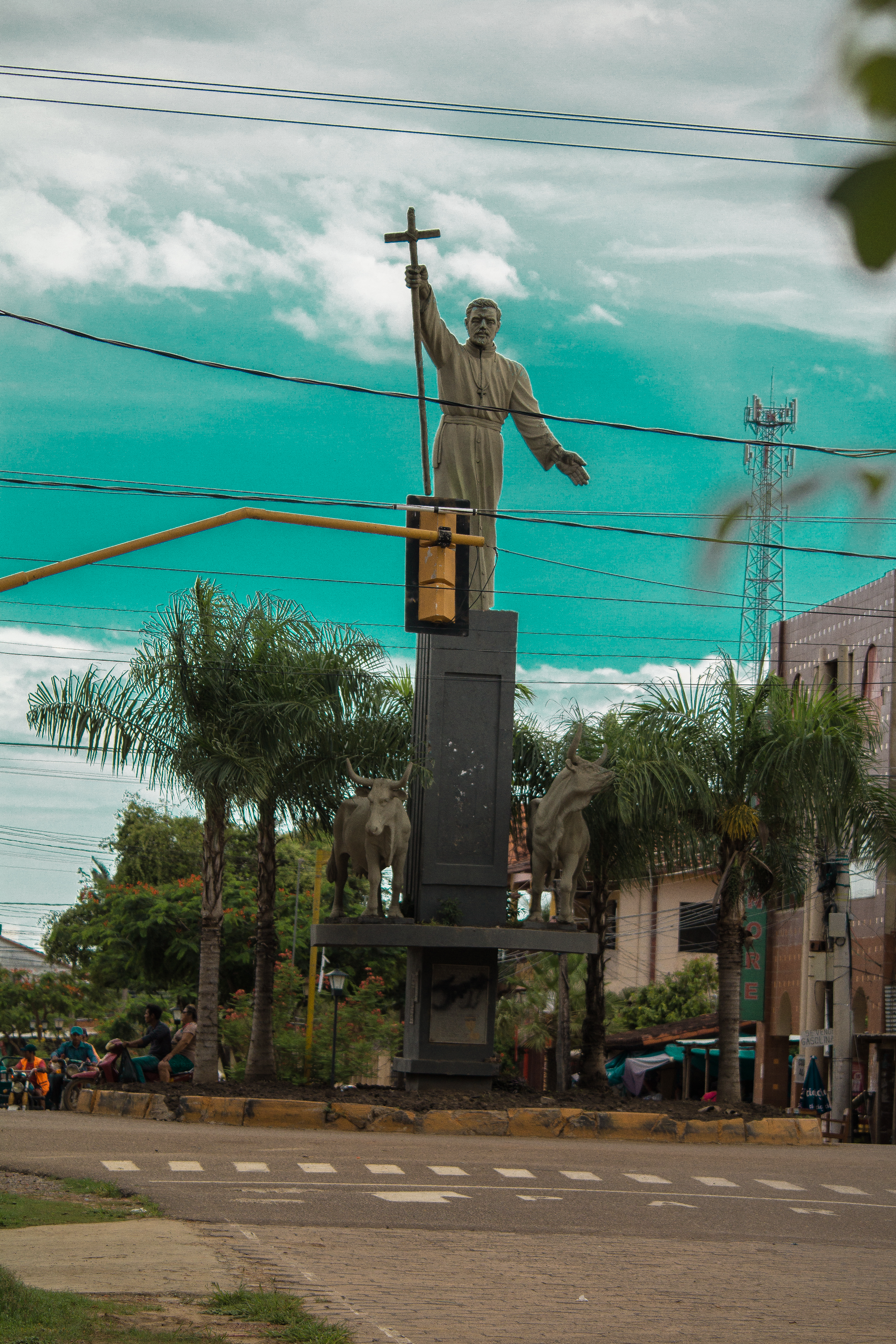
- Sculptural monument of Cipriano Barace in Trinidad-Beni, Bolivia (Devy Shakty, 29 Sep 2018)
- Born: May 5, 1641; Isaba, Spain
- Died: September 16, 1702 (aged 61)
- Citizenship: Spain
- Occupation: Missionary

Cipriano Barace (1641–1702) was a Spanish Jesuit, missionary and martyr. He is the founder of the cities of Trinidad, Loreto and Baures among other towns, in the Department of Beni in Bolivia.

== Biography ==
He was born on 5 May 1641 in Villa de Isaba in Navarre, Spain, the son of Pedro Barace and María Mainz. He studied primary school in Isaba. At this stage of his life he was on the verge of dying on two occasions; the first when some shepherds wanted to kill him by attributing the fire of a hut to him . The second during some floods, when he was about to drown in the river.

With the help of his brother Pascual he went to Valencia to study Philosophy and Theology, which years later allowed him to be named beneficiary of the parish of Isaba.

His religious vocation made him enlist in the Society of Jesus, in imitation of Francis Xavier for whom Barace felt great admiration.

== Missionary Work ==
At the age of 29, Cipriano traveled to the Jesuit province of Peru, being ordained a priest in Lima on June 11, 1673 .

According to a description from 1672 that is preserved in the General Archive of the Indies of Seville (Contratación 42-5-8), his physical appearance was that of a man with " a good body, white, somewhat blond, with signs of wounds over both eyebrows."

He is commissioned, with the help of Father Pedro Marbán and brother José Castillo, to enter the territory of present-day Bolivia, virgin at that time, to find out the degree of disposition of the indigenous people to be evangelized, as well as to explore new territories and report what was observed there, embarking on the Rio Grande in mid-July 1675.

In that territory he founded the first indigenous population with Moxo Indians, which he baptized with the name of Nuestra Señora de Loreto (March 25, 1682). After five years of illness and poor results, he was sent to the territory of the Chiriguano Indians in present-day Paraguay, where he was also unsuccessful in his efforts.

Thus, he returned to the territory of the Moxos of Bolivia. In 1687, he created the current city of Trinidad .

The first French Dictionary of Ecclesiastical History attributes to Barace ( "of an Isabelan homeland" as the documents of the time say) the founding of at least fifteen mission posts and the baptism of at least 11,000 Indians.

Antonio de Orellana - biographer of Father Barace and his superior at the time of his martyrdom - in the work Compendium of the Life of Father Cipriano Barace written the year after his death, describes him as "a character anointed with holiness, an adventurer, kind, optimistic, trusting, detached and dedicated to the salvation of the indigenous people."

He taught the Moxo Indians to weave and also the trades of bricklayer, carpenter, builder and farmer, among others, for which they considered him a true benefactor.

== Death ==
After more than 25 years working with the Moxos and other tribes such as the Cirionenos, Tapacuras, Guarayanos or Moremonos, on August 17, 1702 he left Trinidad, accompanied by four Indians and a mule, to enter the territory of the Baures with whom he managed to establish a good friendship. But the tribal wars between them created a difficult situation from which he could no longer get out.

Thus, on September 16, 1702, when he was passing through a swampy area on his way to one of the missions, he came across a group of Indians armed with bows, arrows, and macanas . A shower of arrows was shot at him, wounding him in the thigh and arm. One of the Indians snatched Barace's cross and at the same time gave him a deadly blow to the head with his baton, thus ending his life at the age of 61.

== Legacy ==
The adventures and hardships he suffered throughout the 27 years he spent as a missionary are unimaginable. To read his biography is to enter the life of a type of man that is difficult to imagine today: adventurer, merchant, doctor and surgeon, architect, explorer, rancher, writer, public relations, etc.

Cipriano Barace had the virtue - recognized by all his biographers - of being fully accepted by the indigenous population despite having broken into their territories in the middle of the colonial era. He learned the language and respected the customs of the Moxo Indians and other tribes, and made his territory a space for free men after having harshly faced the settlers who wanted to enslave the indigenous people. The introduction of livestock to that area not only allowed them to survive then, but still today, since in the Beni region, livestock is the economic engine of the area.

It is curious to observe how today, the farmers of Beni have grouped together creating an anti-globalization movement that they have called the Cipriano Barace Foundation.

Barace is recognized by all sectors of the Church as a reference to imitate. He is currently in the beatification process.
