= Barace (surname) =

Barace is a surname. Notable people with the surname include:

- Cipriano Barace (1641–1702), Spanish Jesuit, missionary, and martyr
- Javier Eseverri Barace (born 1977), Spanish futsal player
