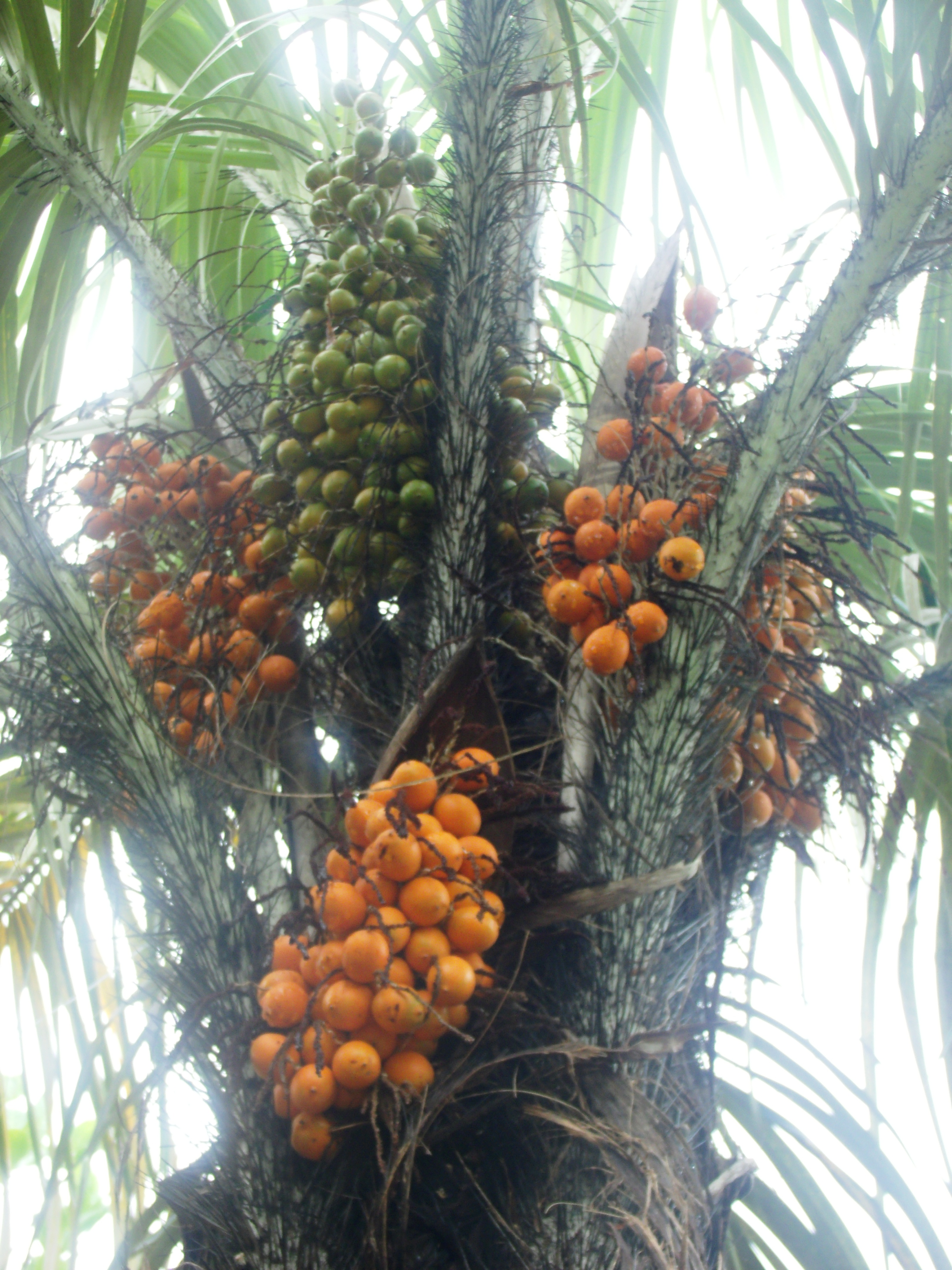

Scientific classification
- Kingdom: Plantae
- Clade: Tracheophytes
- Clade: Angiosperms
- Clade: Monocots
- Clade: Commelinids
- Order: Arecales
- Family: Arecaceae
- Genus: Bactris
- Species: B. setosa

Binomial name
- Bactris setosa Mart.

Synonyms
- Bactris escragnollei Glaz. ex Burret; Bactris lindmanniana Drude ex Lindm.; Bactris setosa var. santensis Barb.Rodr.

= Bactris setosa =

Species of flowering plant

Bactris setosa is a species of flowering plant in the family Arecaceae. It is a palm tree with black and brown prickles, pinnate leaves, and black to purplish fruits. It is native to Brazil, and was described in 1826.

== Taxonomy ==
Bactris setosa was described by Carl Friedrich Philipp von Martius in 1826.

== Distribution ==
Bactris setosa is native to the wet tropical biome of north-east, south, and south-east Brazil. The species is present in the central Brazilian savanna, the Atlantic forest, and the Pampas region.

The species grows in riverine, coastal, seasonally semideciduous, and gallery forests. It is present in open, low, swampy areas, often in standing water, at elevations of 50–300 metres (160–980 ft).

== Description ==
Bactris setosa is a shrub or palm tree. It grows 1.5–6 metres (4.9–19.7 ft) high. The stems are 3–4 centimetres (1.2–1.6 in) wide, and form large clumps. The stems have black, yellowish, and brown prickles, which are up to 6 centimetres (2.4 in) long.

An 1865 illustration of the palm Bactris setosa by Julius Platzmann, from Illustrirte Zeitung

Each plant has two to five leaves, which grow on 0.2–1.1 metres (0.66–3.61 ft) stems. The leaves are pinnate, with segments arranged regularly, or in clusters of two to eight. The leaves have thirty to fifty-seven pairs of segments.

The inflorescences grow on 13–33 centimetres (5.1–13.0 in) stems. The male flowers are 4.5–6 millimetres (0.18–0.24 in) long, and have six stamens. The sepal lobes of male flowers are 1.5–2 millimetres (0.059–0.079 in) long. The petals are 4.5–6 millimetres (0.18–0.24 in) long. The female flowers are 5.5–6 millimetres (0.22–0.24 in) long. The calyx is cup-shaped, and 1–2 millimetres (0.039–0.079 in) long. The corolla is urn-shaped, and 5–5.5 millimetres (0.20–0.22 in) long.

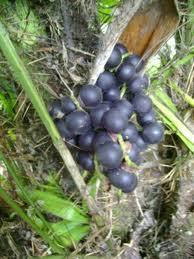
Bactris setosa has round black to purple fruits.

The fruits are 1.5–2 centimetres (0.59–0.79 in) in diameter, black to purplish, roughly spherical, and have a smooth epicarp. The mesocarp is juicy, and the endocarp is oblong.

== Ecology ==
Bactris setosa is eaten by the lowland paca, the Brazilian squirrel, and the golden-headed lion tamarin.

== Names ==
In Portuguese, the species is known as tucum, Uva-do-cerrado, Tucunzeiro, Ticum, or Coquinho-preto.
