= Bernhard Havestadt =

German Jesuit missionary

Bernhard Havestadt (b. at Cologne, 27 February 1714; died at Münster 1781) was a German Jesuit missionary in Chile.

== Life ==
He entered the Lower-Rhenish province of the order on 20 October 1732, and in 1746 went to Chile. He was one of the 102 German Jesuits in the Chilean mission between 1720-67. His 20 years in the country were spent mostly among the Mapuche.

== Works ==
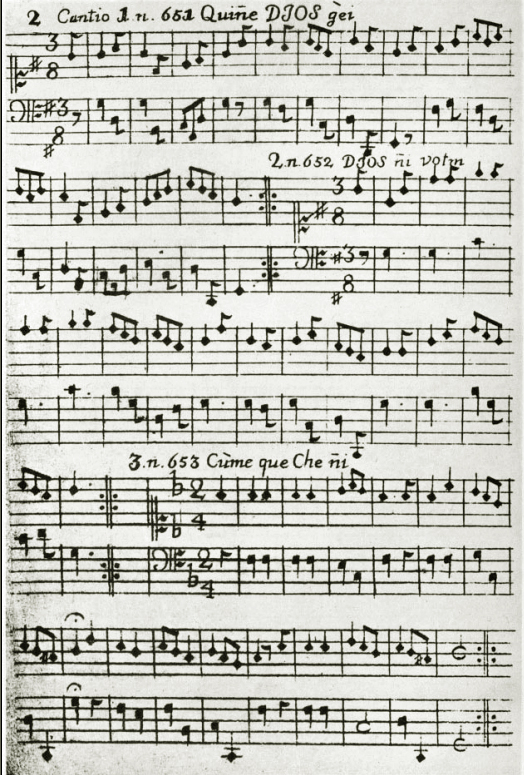
Chilidúgú, sive Res chilenses vel descriptio etc.

A gifted linguist, knowing nine languages, he took up the study of Mapudungun (which he referred to as Chilidugu). In his opinion, it "towered over all other languages as the Andes over all other mountains". The result of these studies appeared in Chilidúǵu, sive Res Chilenses, vel descriptio, status tum naturalis, tum civilis, cum moralis regni populique Chilensis, inserta suis, locis perfectæ ad Chilensem linguam manuductioni etc. (3 vols., Münster, 1777), written in Germany after the expulsion of the Jesuits from the Spanish colonies. It had been originally composed in Spanish, and was now issued in Latin. Besides a grammar and dictionary, it includes copious specimens of the native Chilean tongue, hymns, and valuable ethnographic notes, etc.

The work was re-issued in two volumes by Julius Platzmann, the student of American languages (Leipzig, 1883), under its original title, Chilidúǵu sive tractatus linguæ Chilensi (see Zarncke, "Literar. Centralblatt", 1883, col. 693).
