= Antonio Ruiz de Montoya =

Peruvian Jesuit priest and missionary (1585–1652)

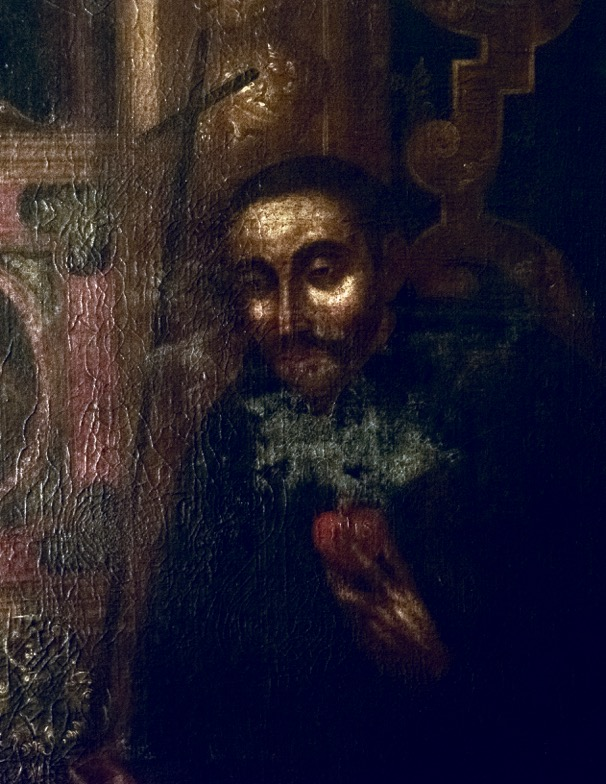
Canvas in San Pedro de Lima, Peru

Antonio Ruiz de Montoya, SJ (13 June 1585 – 11 April 1652) was a Jesuit priest and missionary in the Paraguayan Reductions.

== Life ==
Montoya was born in Lima, Peru on 13 June 1585. He entered the Society of Jesus on 1 November 1606. In the same year, he accompanied Diego Torres, the first provincial of Paraguay, to this mission.

In co-operation with José Cataldino and Simon Mazeta, he founded the Reductions of Guayra. He also brought a number of tribal groups into the Catholic Church, and is said to have personally baptized 100,000 Indigenous people. As head of the missions from 1620, he had charge of the missions on the upper and middle course of the Paraná River, on the Uruguay River, and the Tape River; he added thirteen missions to the twenty-six already existing.

When the missions of Guayra were endangered by the incursions of Paulistas from Brazil in search of slaves, Mazeta and Montoya resolved to move the Christian Indians, about 15,000 in number, to the reductions in Paraguay, partly by water using several hundred rafts and canoes, and partly by land through the forest. The plan was successfully carried out in 1631. "This expedition", says von Ihering, "is one of the most extraordinary undertakings of this kind known in history" [Globus, LX (1891), 179].

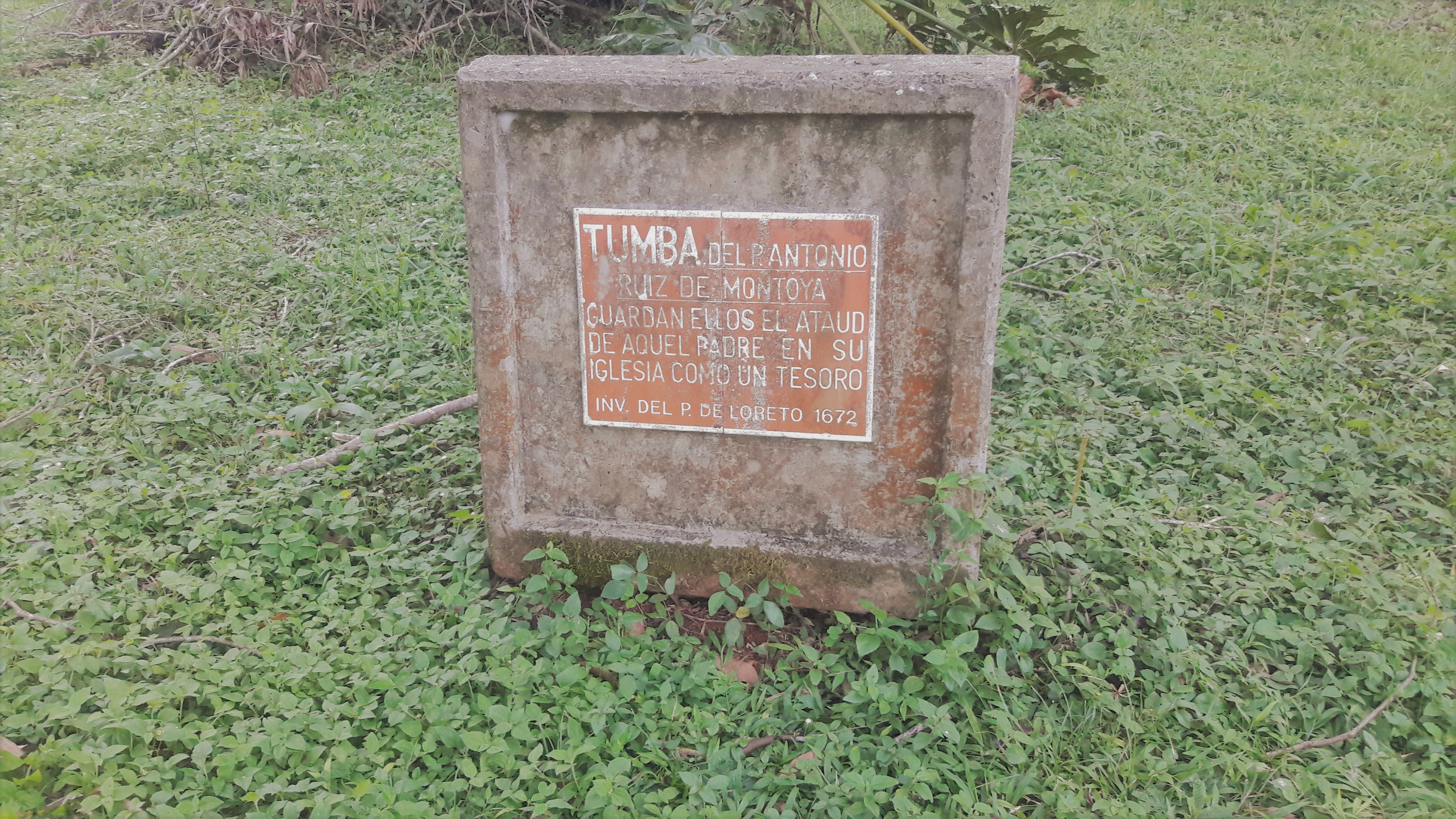
Montoya's tomb

In 1637 Montoya (on behalf of the governor, the Bishop of Paraguay, and the heads of the orders) laid a complaint before Philip IV of Spain as to the Portuguese policy of sending kidnapping expeditions into the neighboring regions. He obtained from the king important exemptions, privileges, and protective measures for the reductions of Paraguay. Soon after his return to America, Montoya died in Lima, Peru, on 11 April 1652.

== Works ==
Ruiz de Montoya was a scholar of the Guaraní language of the Amerindians, and left standard works on it. These are:

- Tesoro de la lingua guaraní (Madrid, 1639), a quarto of 407 pages
- Conquista espiritual hecha por los religiosos de la Compañía de Jesús en las provincias del Paraguay, Paraná, Uruguay y Tape"(Madrid, 1639). A newer edition was made at Bilbao: Corazón de Jesús (1892).
- Arte y vocabulario de la lingua guaraní (Madrid, 1640), a quarto of 234 pages
- Catecismo de la lingua guaraní (Madrid, 1640), a quarto of 336 pages
- Silex del Divino Amor" (1640), unedited in Montoya's times. The first edition was made in 1991 by the Pontifical Catholic University of Peru in Lima. More recently a new transcription of the original manuscript found in Lilly's Library has been edited: Juan Dejo, Mística y Espiritualidad. Misión jesuita en Perú y Paraguay (siglo XVII), Lima, UARM-BNP, 2018. Vol. 2.

Marion Mulhall called Ruiz de Montoya's grammar and vocabulary "a lasting memorial of his industry and learning". German linguist Georg von der Gabelentz regarded them as the very best sources for the study of the Guaraní language, while Lorenzo Hervas y Panduro declared that the clearness and comprehensive grasp of the rules to which Montoya traced back the complicated structure and pronunciation of Guaraní are most extraordinary. All three works were repeatedly republished and revised. In 1876, Julius Platzmann, the German scholar in Native American languages, issued at Leipzig an exact reprint of the first Madrid edition of this work "unique among the grammars and dictionaries of the American languages". A Latin version was edited by the German scholar David Christoph Seybold at Stuttgart in 1890-91. A collected edition of all Montoya's works was published at Vienna under the supervision of the Vicomte de Porto Seguro in 1876.

Of much importance as one of the oldest authorities for the history of the Reductions of Paraguay is Montoya's work, Conquista espiritual hecha por los religiosos de la C. de J. en las provincias del Paraguay, Paraña, Uruguay y Tape (Madrid, 1639), in quarto; a new edition was issued at Bilbao in 1892. In addition to the works already mentioned, Montoya wrote a number of ascetical treatises.

Letters and various literary remains of Ruiz de Montoya are found in the Memorial histor. español, XVI (Madrid, 1862), 57 sqq.; in Litterae annuae provinc. Paraguariae (Antwerp, 1600), and in the Memorial sobre limites de la Repúbl. Argentina con el Paraguay (Buenos Aires, 1867), I, appendix; II, 216-252; cf. Backer-Sommervogel, Bibliothèque de la Compagnie de Jésus, VI, 1675 sqq.

== Bibliography ==
- Joseph Dahlmann, Die Sprachenkunde und die Missionen (Freiburg 1891), 84 sqq.
- Montoya, Conquista espiritual (Bilbao), Prologo
- Enrique Torres Saldamando, Los antiquos Jesuitas del Peru (Lima, 1882), 61 sqq.
- Francisco Xarque, Vida de P. Ant. Ruiz de Montova (Saragossa, 1662); there is another edition from Spain: Victoriano Suárez (1900)
- Alonso López de Andrade, Varones ilustres (Madrid, 1666)
- Julius Platzmann, Verzeichniss einer Auswahl amerikan. Grammatiken, Worterbucher, etc. (Leipzig, 1876), s. vv. Guarani and Ruiz;
- Marion Mulhall, Between the Amazon and Andes (London, 1881), 248 sqq.
- Revista Peruana, IV, 119.
- José Luis Rouillon, S.J. Introducción a la edición del Silex del Divino Amor, Lima, PUCP, 1991
- Juan Dejo, S.J. Mística y Espiritualidad. Misión jesuita en Perú y Paraguay (sigloXVII). Lima, UARM-BNP, 2018. Two volumes.
