= Benedictus Gotthelf Teubner =

German typographer and publisher (1784–1856)

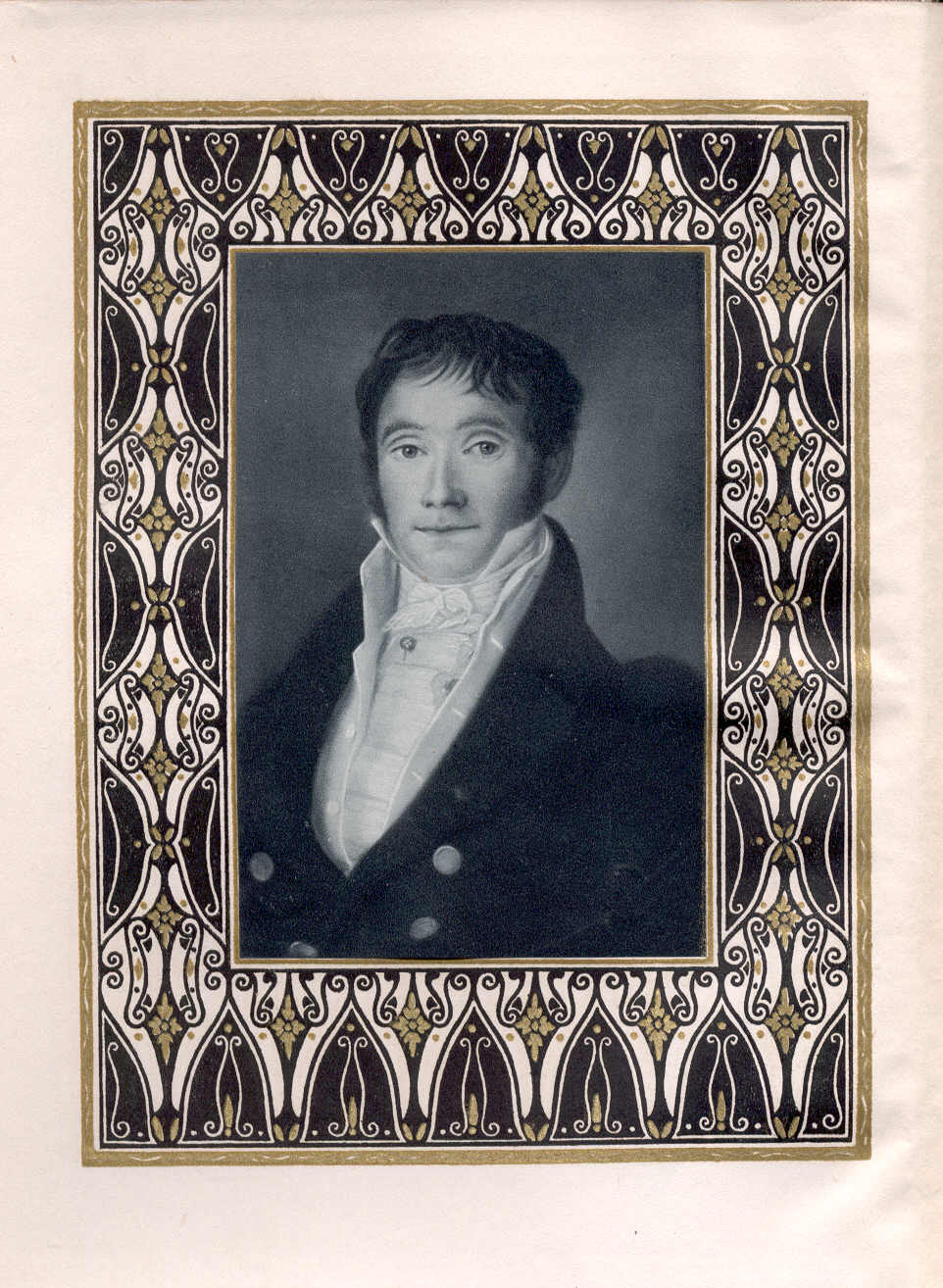
Benedictus Gotthelf Teubner. 1911 reproduction of an 1811 portrait.

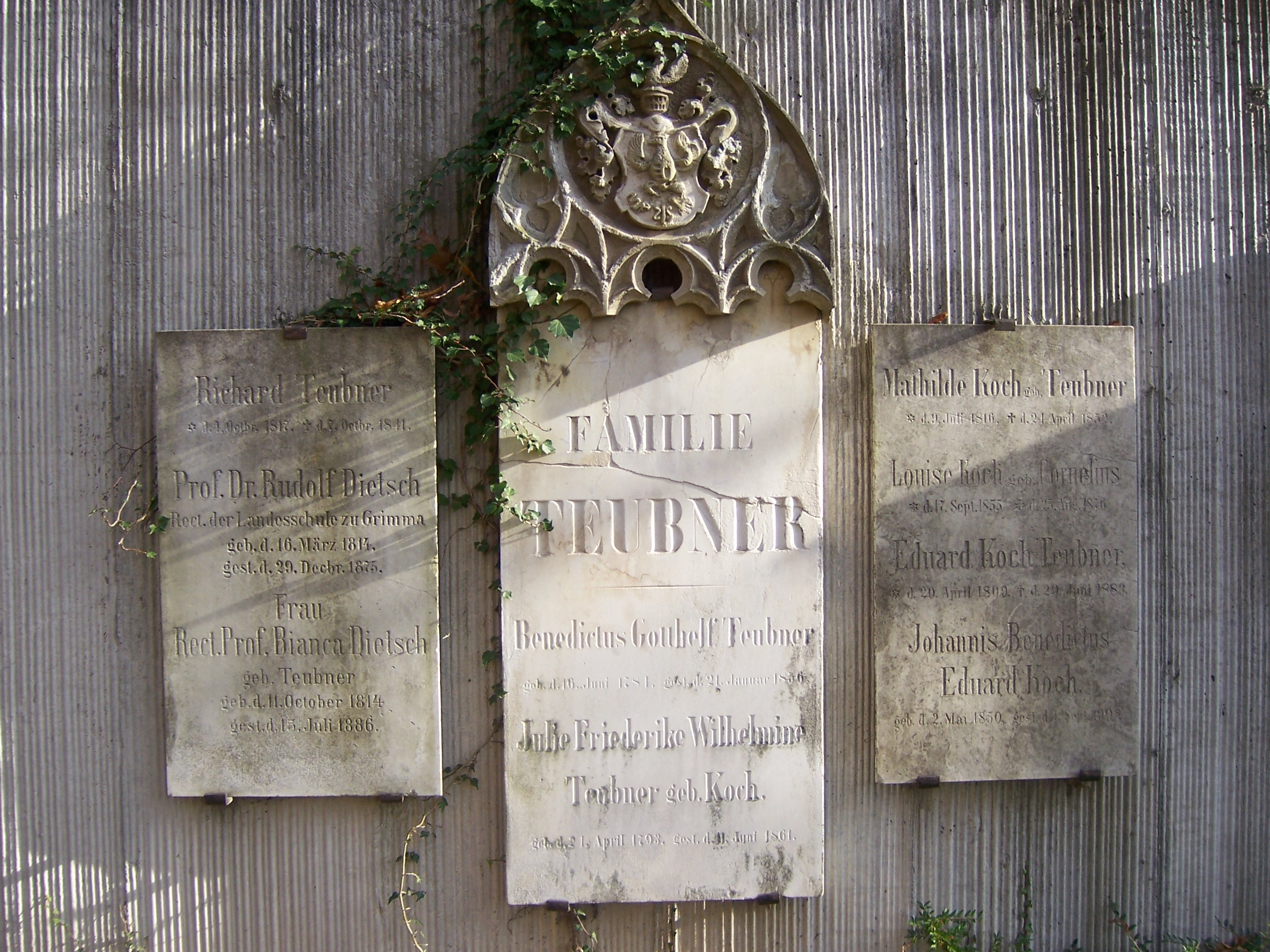
Grave sign of the family of B. G. Teubner

Benedictus Gotthelf Teubner (born 16 June 1784 in Grosskrausnik in Luckau in Lower Lusatia; died 21 January 1856 in Leipzig) was a German bookseller and the founder of a publishing company.

== Life ==
Teubner was a printer. In 1811 he brought the Weinedelsche printing press to Leipzig, which he would bring to importance within Germany. He founded another press in Dresden towards the end of the 18th century. The addition of a publishing business to the printing house followed in 1824, which published in the areas of philology and higher education in Germany. The well-known series of classical publications known as the Bibliotheca scriptorum graecorum et romanorum Teubneriana emerged from this. In Leipzig Teubner was a member of the Apollo Masonic lodge.

Teubner died on 21 January 1856 in Leipzig and left the business to his sons-in-law Christian Adolf Roßbach (1822-1898) and Albin Ackermann.

== Honors ==
For the 1840 book History of the Art of Printing ("Geschichte der Buchdruckerkunst"), Friedrich Wilhelm IV awarded Teubner a golden tribute medal in recognition of "the typographical value of the work", and the English royal couple, to whom a copy had been presented, awarded him a golden coronation medal. King Frederick Augustus of Saxony received the dedication.

A street in Leipzig is named after Teubner.

== See also ==
- Stiftung Benedictus Gotthelf Teubner
- Teubnersche Verlagsbuchhandlung (B. G. Teubner Verlag, Teubner-Verlag)
- Vieweg+Teubner Verlag
