= Loreto, Beni =

- Location of Loreto in Bolivia
- Coordinates: 15°11′34″S 64°45′32″W
- Country: Bolivia
- Department: Beni Department
- Province: Marbán Province
- Municipality: Loreto Municipality
- Elevation: 520 ft (160 m)

Population (2001)
  - Total: 843
- Time zone: UTC-4 (BOT)

Loreto is a small municipality in the Beni Department in northern Bolivia, capital of the Marbán Province and Loreto Municipality. In 2001, Loreto had a population of 843.

== History ==
Loreto was the first of the Jesuit Missions of Moxo to be founded. Loreto Mission was founded in 1682.

== Languages ==
Camba Spanish is the primary vernacular lingua franca spoken in the town. Loretano, a Moxo dialect, is the main indigenous language spoken.
