= Walford Davies =

British composer (1869-1941)

Major Sir Henry Walford Davies KCVO OBE
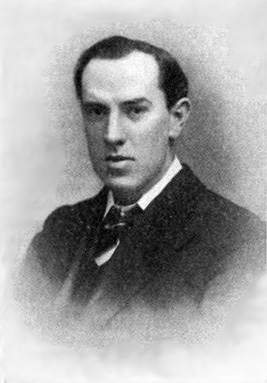

16th Master of the King's Music
- In office 6 April 1934 – 11 March 1941
- Monarchs: George V Edward VIII; George VI
- Preceded by: Edward Elgar
- Succeeded by: Arnold Bax

Personal details
- Born: Henry Walford Davies; 6 September 1869 Oswestry, Shropshire, England
- Died: 11 March 1941 (aged 71) Wrington, North Somerset, England
- Education: Royal College of Music
- Military career
- Allegiance: United Kingdom
- Branch: Royal Air Force
- Service years: 1918-1919
- Rank: Major; Director of Music

Major Sir Henry Walford Davies (6 September 1869 – 11 March 1941) was a renowned English composer, organist, and educator who was Master of the King's Music from 1934 until 1941. He was also a music adviser to the British Broadcasting Corporation, for which he gave commended talks on music between 1924 and 1941.

His most widely known works are the Royal Air Force March Past, God Be In My Head, and Solemn Melody.

== Life and career ==
=== Early years ===
Henry Walford Davies was born in Oswestry, Shropshire. He was the seventh of nine children of John Whitridge Davies and Susan, née Gregory, and the youngest of four surviving sons. His father, although an accountant by profession, was an amateur musician who founded and conducted a choral society at Oswestry and was choirmaster of Christ Church Congregational church: at which Walford was a chorister, and at which Walford's siblings, Charlie and Harold, later held the post of organist. Harold Davies was professor of music at the University of Adelaide from 1919 to 1947. In 1882 Walford was accepted as a chorister at St George's Chapel, Windsor Castle, by the organist, Sir George Elvey.

When his voice broke in 1885 Davies left the choir and was appointed organist of the Royal Chapel of All Saints, Windsor Great Park and was secretary to Elvey's successor, Walter Parratt, and Dean (later Archbishop) Randall Davidson. At this time British universities, including Cambridge, awarded "non-collegiate" music degrees to any applicant who could pass the necessary examinations. (Note: Stanford, who was appointed professor of music at Cambridge in 1887 disapproved of this arrangement, and in the mid-1890s persuaded the university authorities to require a course of study at Cambridge as a prerequisite for sitting the examinations. Other universities followed suit later.) Davies entered for the Cambridge bachelor of music examinations in 1889, but his exercise (a cantata, The Future, to words by Matthew Arnold) failed. With the encouragement of Charles Villiers Stanford, professor of music at Cambridge, Davies made a second attempt, which was successful, and he graduated in 1891.

In 1890 Davies was awarded a scholarship in composition at the Royal College of Music (RCM), London, where he was a student until 1894. His teachers there were Hubert Parry and (for a single term) Stanford for composition, and W. S. Rockstro (counterpoint), Herbert Sharpe (piano) and Haydn Inwards (violin). While still at the RCM he was organist of St George's Church, Campden Hill, for three months, and St Anne's Church, Soho for a year until 1891, when he resigned for health reasons. In the following year he was appointed organist of Christ Church, Hampstead; he remained there until 1897, holding the post in tandem for the last two years with an appointment from 1895 as teacher of counterpoint at the RCM in succession to Rockstro, a post that he held until 1903. He considered resigning the post in 1896, when he failed the counterpoint paper in the Cambridge examinations for the degree of doctor of music; he was successful at his second attempt, and the doctorate was conferred in March 1898.

Walford Davies in the ceremonial uniform of a Knight Commander of the Royal Victorian Order with Lady Davies, Windsor Castle, c. 1940

=== National reputation ===
In May 1898 Davies was appointed organist and director of the choir at the Temple Church in the City of London, a post he retained until 1923. With this appointment, in the view of his biographer, Jeremy Dibble, Davies began to be seen as a prominent figure in British musical life. As an organist he became well known both as a soloist and as a teacher – the most distinguished of his pupils being Leopold Stokowski. As a conductor he directed the London Church Choir Association (1901–13) and succeeded Stanford at the Bach Choir (1902–07).

As a composer Davies achieved his most substantial success in 1904, with his cantata Everyman, based on the 15th century morality play of the same name. His friend and biographer H. C. Colles wrote, "[T]he music itself was not like anything he had written before or would write again. Everyman was tumultuously received, and in the next few years given by every choral society in the country which aimed at a standard of firstrateness." The work was also given in Australia and the US.

During the First World War, Davies joined the Committee for Music in War Time under Parry's chairmanship, organised concerts for the troops in France and musical events for the Fight for Right movement. In 1918 he was appointed director of music of the Royal Air Force, with the rank of Major, as which he established the RAF School of Music (which was attached to the Guildhall School of Music) and two RAF bands, and composed the "Royal Air Force March Past", to which a slow "trio" section was later added by his successor Major George Dyson. Since 1930 his Solemn Melody has been frequently performed as mourning music on Remembrance Sunday at The Cenotaph, Whitehall.

=== 1919–41 ===
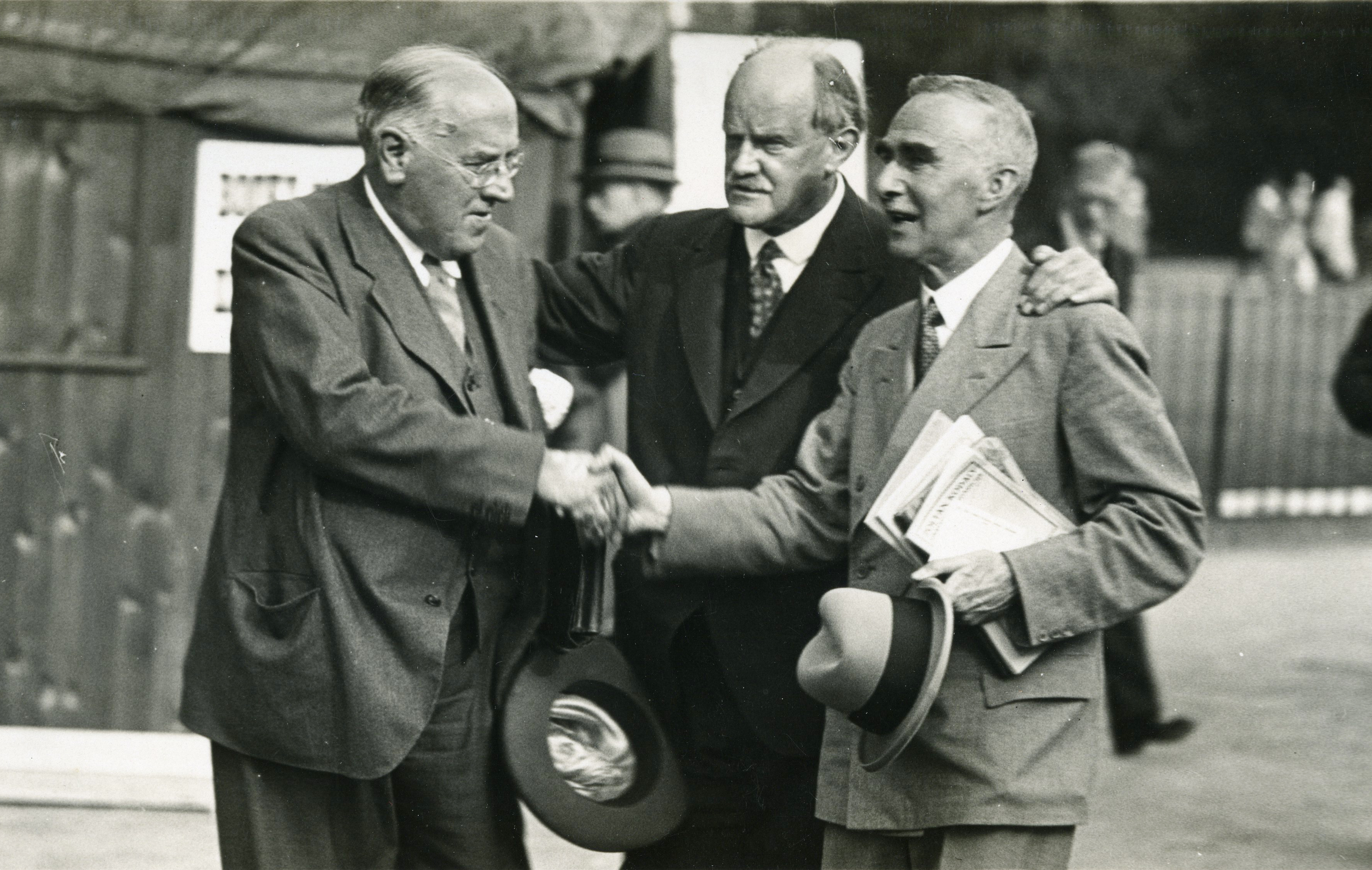
Walford Davies (left) in about 1932 with fellow musicians Sir Hugh Allen (centre) and Cyril Rootham (right)

In 1919 Davies accepted the professorship of music at University College, Aberystwyth, together with the post of director of music for the University of Wales and chairman of the National Council of Music. Here, in the words of his biographer Henry Ley, he "laboured unceasingly for the musical enlightenment of the principality", and in 1922 he was knighted in David Lloyd George's resignation honours.

In 1924 he gave the Cramb lectures at the University of Glasgow, gave his first broadcast talk for the BBC, and was appointed Gresham professor of music at the University of London. In the same year, at the age of fifty-four, he married (Constance) Margaret Isabel Evans (1898–1984), daughter of the Rev William Evans, Rector of Narberth, Pembrokeshire; she was his junior by twenty-eight years.

Davies wrote his famous piece God Be In My Head at Witham Hall. Davies and his wife (who was secretary of the Windsor and Eton Choral Society) were the godparents of Bridget Lyons: who was the daughter of the choral-educator James William Webb-Jones (who was the headmaster of the choral foundation of St George's School, Windsor Castle) and the wife of the choral-educator Peter Stanley Lyons (who was subsequently the headmaster of Witham Hall School). After her husband's death, Lady Walford Davies married Julian Harold Legge Lambart, who was Vice-Provost of Eton College.

Davies resigned his professorship at Aberystwyth in 1926, when he was appointed by the BBC as a music adviser, but he remained chairman of the National Council of Music until his death. He was from 1927 to 1932 organist and director of St. George's Chapel, Windsor Castle.

Davies's BBC broadcast in April 1924 was the first of many he made between then and 1941. He became well known for his programmes "Music and the Ordinary Listener" (1926–9), his wartime broadcasts for children (1939–41), and "Everyman's Music" (1940–41). The Musical Times called him "one of the world's first great broadcasters"; The Times, in an obituary tribute said:

[H]is name has become known to many thousands of people who have not been interested hitherto in music or in musicians. He proved himself to be one of the very few lecturers who could immediately establish the sense of personal contact with audiences over the wireless. They have felt that they knew him and could enter into music, which was the absorbing interest of his life, through the personal relation which he always established immediately with his audiences. It was an almost unique gift.

Colles wrote that Davies's regular listeners felt a proprietorial interest in him, recording one of them as remarking, "He always seemed to come right into the room with us."

On the death of Sir Edward Elgar in 1934, Davies was appointed to succeed him as Master of the King's Music. (Note: The title, long rendered as "Master of the King's Musick", was changed to the modern spelling during Elgar's tenure. Although The Times and others continued to favour the old spelling, Davies's appointment was officially gazetted as "Master of the Music".) As musical adviser to the BBC Davies moved from London to Bristol when the BBC Symphony Orchestra and the corporation's music administration moved there on the outbreak of the Second World War in 1939.

Davies died at Wrington, near Bristol, on 11 March 1941, and his ashes were interred in the graveyard of Bristol Cathedral.

== Compositions ==
(Incomplete list)

=== Orchestral ===
- A Dedication Overture (1893)
- Overture in G major (1893)
- Symphony in D major (1894)
- Overture, A Welshman in London (1899)
- Overture to Everyman, Op. 17 (1905)
- Suite, Holiday Tunes, Op. 21 (1907)
- Prelude, Solemn Melody for organ and orchestra (1909)
- Festal Overture, Op. 31 (1909)
- Symphony [No. 2] in G, Op. 32 (1911)
- Suite, Parthenia, Op. 34 (1911)
- Suite in C after Wordsworth, Op. 37 (1912)
- Conversations for piano and orchestra, Op. 43 (1914)
- Royal Air Force March Past (1918, jointly with George Dyson)
- Memorial Melody (1919)
- A Memorial Suite, Op. 50 (1923)
- A Children's Symphony, for small orchestra, Op. 53 (1927)
- Memorial Melody in C (1936)
- Big Ben Looks On, orchestral fantasy (1937)

=== Choral and vocal ===
- The Future, for chorus and orchestra (1889)
- Ode on the Morning of Christ’s Nativity, cantata for soloists, chorus and orchestra (1891–92)
- Music: An Ode, for soprano, chorus and orchestra (1892–93)
- Herve Riel, for chorus and orchestra, Op. 2 (1894)
- Prospice, for baritone and string quartet, Op. 6 (1894)
- Days of Man, oratorio for chorus and orchestra (1897)
- Six Pastorals, for vocal quartet, string quartet and piano, Op. 15 (1897)
- God created man for incorruption, motet for soloists, double choir and orchestra, Op. 9 (1897-1905)
- Three Jovial Huntsmen, cantata for soloists, chorus and orchestra, Op. 11 (1902)
- The Temple, oratorio, Op. 14 (1902)
- Everyman, morality [cantata], Op. 17 (1904, revised 1934)
- The Lamb, soprano 1&2 and alto, from Four Songs of Innocence.
- Lift Up Your Hearts, sacred symphony for baritone, chorus and orchestra, Op. 20 (1906)
- Songs of a Day, for soloists, chorus and chamber orchestra, Op. 24a (1908)
- Songs of Nature, for soloists, chorus and small orchestra, Op. 24b (1908)
- The Long Journey, song-cycle for bass and orchestra, Op. 25 (1908–10)
- Grace to you, and peace, motet for chorus, strings, brass, timpani and organ, Op. 26 (1908)
- Ode on Time, for baritone, chorus and orchestra, Op. 27 (1908)
- Noble Numbers, cantata for soprano, contralto, tenor, baritone, bass, chorus and orchestra, Op. 28 (1909)
- Five Sayings of Jesus, for tenor, chorus and orchestra, Op. 35 (1911)
- Song of St. Francis, cantata for soprano, contralto, tenor, bass, chorus and orchestra, Op. 36 (1912)
- A Fantasy (from Dante’s Divine Comedy), for tenor, chorus and orchestra, Op. 42 (1914)
- A Short Requiem, for choir and organ, Op. 44a (1915)
- Heaven’s Gate, for mezzo-soprano, chorus and small orchestra, Op. 47 (1916)
- Men and Angels, for chorus and orchestra, Op. 51 (1925)
- High Heaven’s King, for soprano, baritone, chorus and orchestra, Op. 52 (1926)
- Christ in the Universe, for tenor, bass, chorus, piano and orchestra, Op. 55 (1929)
- Te Deum, for double choir and orchestra, Op. 56 (1930)
- London Calling the Schools, for voice, piano, orchestra and announcer (1932)

=== Hymn Tunes ===
- Temple for the hymn 'O King enthroned on high' by John Brownlie (hymnist) 1857-1925 (New English Hymnal #421).
- Oswald's Tree (Oswestry, his place of birth) for the hymn 'Great Shepherd of they people, hear' by John Newton 1725-1807 (Hymns Ancient & Modern New Standard #164).

=== Chamber music ===
- String Quartet No. 1 in D minor (1891–92)
- Piano Quartet No. 1 in E flat (1892)
- Piano Quartet No. 2 in D minor (1893)
- Violin Sonata No. 1 in E flat major (1893–95)
- Violin Sonata No. 2 in A major (1893–95)
- Violin Sonata No. 3 in E minor, Op. 5 (1894) (Note: Published by Novello as No.1.)
- Piano Quartet No. 3 in C major (1895–96)
- String Quartet No. 2 in C minor (1895–97)
- Violin Sonata No. 4 in D minor, Op. 7 (1896) (Note: Published by Novello as No.2.)
- Piano Trio in C major (1897)
- Violin Sonata No. 5 in F major (1899) (Note: Only the first two movements were completed, the third movement is unfinished.)
- Peter Pan, miniature suite for string quartet, Op. 30 (1909)
- Piano Quintet in G major, Op. 54 (1927, revised 1940)

== Notes, references and sources ==
=== Sources ===
- Rodmell, Paul (2002). Charles Villiers Stanford. Aldershot: Scolar Press. ISBN 1-85928-198-2.

Other offices
| New title RAF established | Royal Air Force Director of Music; 1918 - 1919 | Succeeded by Sir George Dyson |
Court offices
| Preceded by Sir Edward Elgar | Master of the King's Musick; 1934–1941 | Succeeded by Sir Arnold Bax |
