= Ernest William Jones =

Welsh shipbroker and cricketer

Ernest William Jones FICS
- Born: 24 October 1870; Glamorgan, Wales
- Died: 15 September 1941 (aged 70); Glamorgan, Wales
- Education: Wycliffe College, Gloucestershire
- Occupations: International chartered shipbroker of M. Jones and Bro. (1856–1942) of Swansea Docks
- Known for: First class cricketer
- Relatives: Lieutenant-Colonel William Matthew Jones VD (father); Arthur Webb-Jones, gynaecologist (brother); James William Webb-Jones (son); Edwin Price Jones Vice-Consul for Chile (cousin); William (Bill) Wynn Jones, Anglican Bishop of Central Tanganyika (cousin)
- Cricket career

Cricket information
- Role: Batsman

International information
- National side: South Wales (1905 - 1909)

Domestic team information
- Years: Team
- (1886 - 1904): Swansea
- (1890 - 1911): Glamorgan County Cricket Club
- (1913 - 1940): Gentlemen of Glamorgan
- (1928 - 1940): Jesters Cricket Club

Ernest William Jones (24 October 1870 – 15 September 1941) FICS was a Welsh international chartered shipbroker, and a first class cricketer.

His wife was the 2nd-great granddaughter of the famous London property-developer James Burton Senior (who was the owner and developer and designer of the main part of Regent Street between Piccadilly Circus and Oxford Circus; and the owner and developer of parts of Regent's Park; and the developer of Hyde Park).

== Family ==
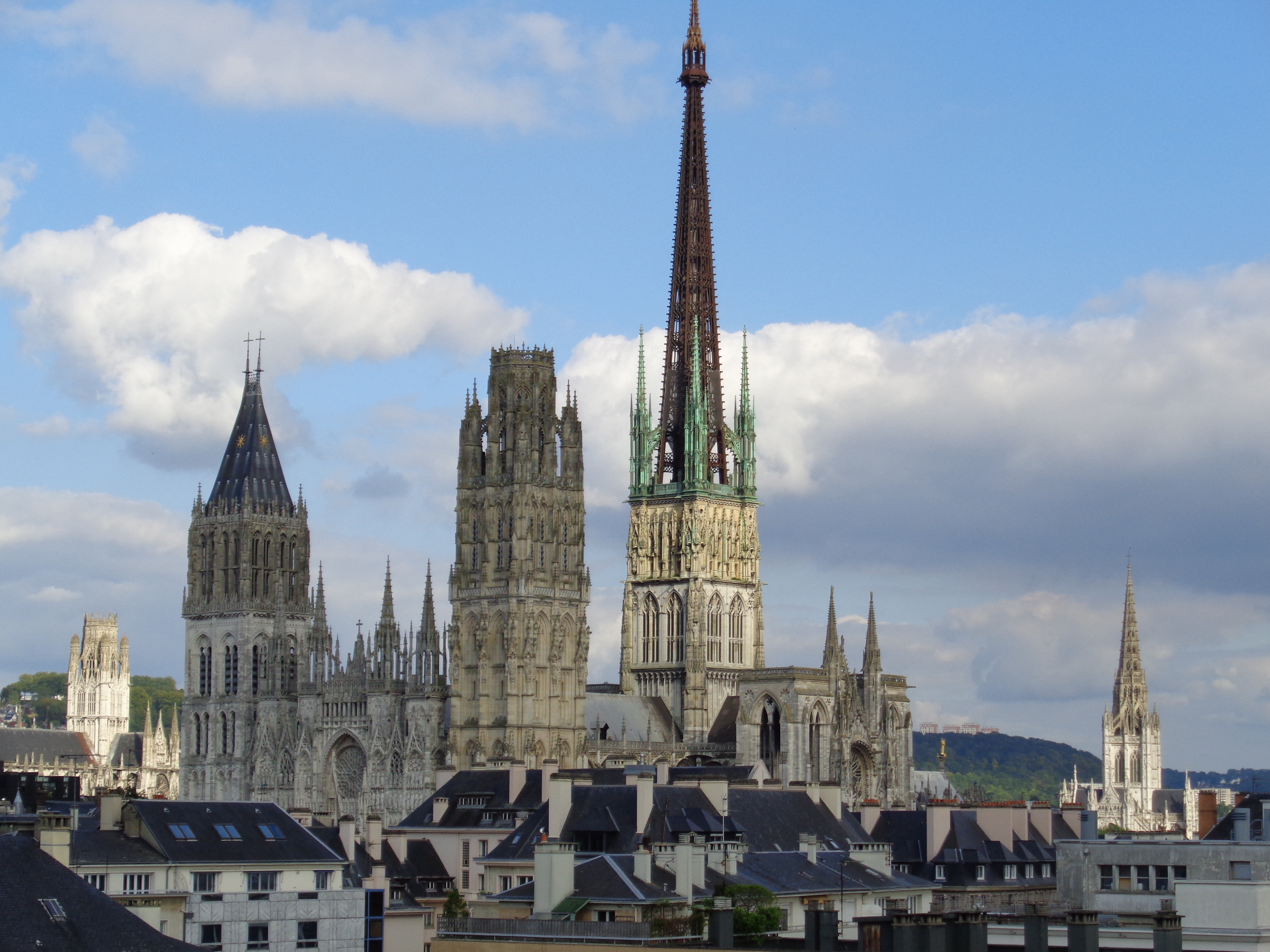
Rouen, Haute Normandie

Ernest was born in Glamorgan on 24 October 1870 to an upper middle class family. He was the elder son of Lieutenant-Colonel William Matthew Jones VD (1838 - 1921), of the 1st Swansea Corps of the 1st Glamorganshire Artillery Volunteers, who was a founder and owner of the international chartered shipbrokerage M. Jones and Bro. (1856–1942). His paternal grandfather was the mariner Matthew Jones Senior (1800–1867).

Ernest's only sibling was the prominent gynaecologist Arthur Webb-Jones (1875–1917).

Ernest's cousins were polyglot Edwin Price Jones (1855 - 1924), who (after a lauded pupillage at the Royal Masonic School, Wood Green) was Vice-Consul for Chile and President of the Swansea Chamber of Commerce; and William (Bill) Wynn Jones, who was Anglican Bishop of Central Tanganyika.

Ernest was educated at Wycliffe College, Gloucestershire. He lived at Casina Rosa, Mumbles, Glamorgan.

== Chartered Shipbroker ==
Ernest inherited ownership of the international chartered shipbrokerage M. Jones and Bro. (1856–1942) that was based at the South Dock of Swansea Docks, and traded with France, Ireland, and Glasgow. Ernest served as its director for his life.

He was a member of the Port Employers' Association, a Fellow of the Institute of Chartered Shipbrokers, and Chairman of the Swansea Pilotage Authority from 1930 until his death, which occurred at Pinewood Road, on 15 September 1941. His shipbrokerage, M. Jones and Bro., was dissolved in 1942, as a consequence of World War II.

Ernest during March 1912 gave evidence at the coroner's inquest into the suicide of his cousin and business partner Matthew Tertius Jones (1853 - 1912), who had committed suicide using 'Prussic acid' (hydrogen cyanide) which Matthew Tertius had claimed to need to kill a dog.

== Cricket ==
Ernest had a 45-year cricketing career for Swansea from 1886 to 1904; and for Glamorgan County Cricket Club from 1890 to 1911 (between which he played in every single match and was a member of the side that won the Minor Counties Championship in 1900); and (in first class cricket) for South Wales from 1905 and 1909, during which he captained them against Australia at Cardiff; and for the Gentleman of Glamorgan from 1913.

Henry Sampson, under his pseudonym 'Pendragon', described Ernest William Jones thus: It would be no exaggeration to say that the late Mr E. W. Jones was the most successful of all the amateur batsmen produced by Swansea in the days before the promotion of Glamorgan to first-class rank. He had some prolific opening partnerships with W. J. Bancroft, and I recall now, on one occasion, the pair knocked up over 200 against Llandovery before they were separated. Another memory of 'E. W.' is that of his captaincy of a South Wales XI against the Australians at Cardiff. ...I was enabled, through the good offices of Mr. Jones, to get an interview with M. A. Noble, the Australian captain, in the course of which he referred to the side which opposed the tourists as being equal if not better than many of those which were engaged in the first-class counties' competition. E. W. Jones belonged to a period long before the formation of the South Wales and Monmouthshire League. [...] A fine specimen of manhood, 'E. W.' would have been a great acquisition to Glamorgan, if he had been of a later generation. Not only was he an astute captain, but he was 'first-class' as a batsman in every sense of the term. 'E. W.' was a contemporary, at St. Helen's, of other outstanding batsmen besides W. J. Bancroft. He played with that immaculate builder of useful scores, the late Stanley Rees, and associated with him as well were [sic] the late Dr. Edgar Reid.

Ernest, and his son James William, and his cousin William (Bill) Wynn Jones, were all members of the Jesters Cricket Club, which was co-founded by James William during 1928.

== Marriage and Issue ==
On 10 September 1900, at All Saints' Church and at the British Consulate at Rouen, Haute Normandie, Ernest married Aimée Elizabeth Parson (1873–1918), who was the French-born third daughter of the banker James Holmes Parson, of Le Houlme and Montville, Seine-Maritime. Her mother was Jessy Burton, who was a daughter of the solicitor William Warwick Burton, and the great-granddaughter of the famous London property-developer James Burton Senior.

Her grandfather was the solicitor and engineer George John Parson, of Adelphi Terrace, Strand, and Camden Square, Middlesex, and Haslemere, Surrey, and Anna Maria Holmes.

Ernest and Aimée's only child was the choral educator James William Webb-Jones (b. 1904), whose only child Bridget married the choral educator Peter Stanley Lyons in 1957.

=== Wife's family ===
Ernest's wife's eldest sister Jessie/Jessy Sarah Parson (later Endall) (d. 22 April 1941) had been selected by Crown Princess Sofia of Greece to be from 1898 Lady Superintendent and Matron of the First Military Hospital at Athens, for which she received the Commemorative Medal of the Red Cross from Queen Olga of Greece. Jessie/Jessy Sarah Parson had been previously Lady Superintendent of the English Hospital at the Piraeus during the Greco-Turkish War (1897), and was latterly, as Jessie/Jessy Sarah Endall, Matron of the Children's Hospital at Athens.

Jessie/Jessy Sarah married, on 11 September 1903, at Kamloops, British Columbia, George William Endall, of Monte Creek, British Columbia, who was the fourth son of William Endall of Henley-in-Arden, England.

Ernest's wife's only brother James W. L. married Ethel Tullidge, who was the third daughter of T. I. Tullidge of Exeter, during 1901.
