= Witham Hall School =

School in Witham on the Hill, Lincolnshire, England

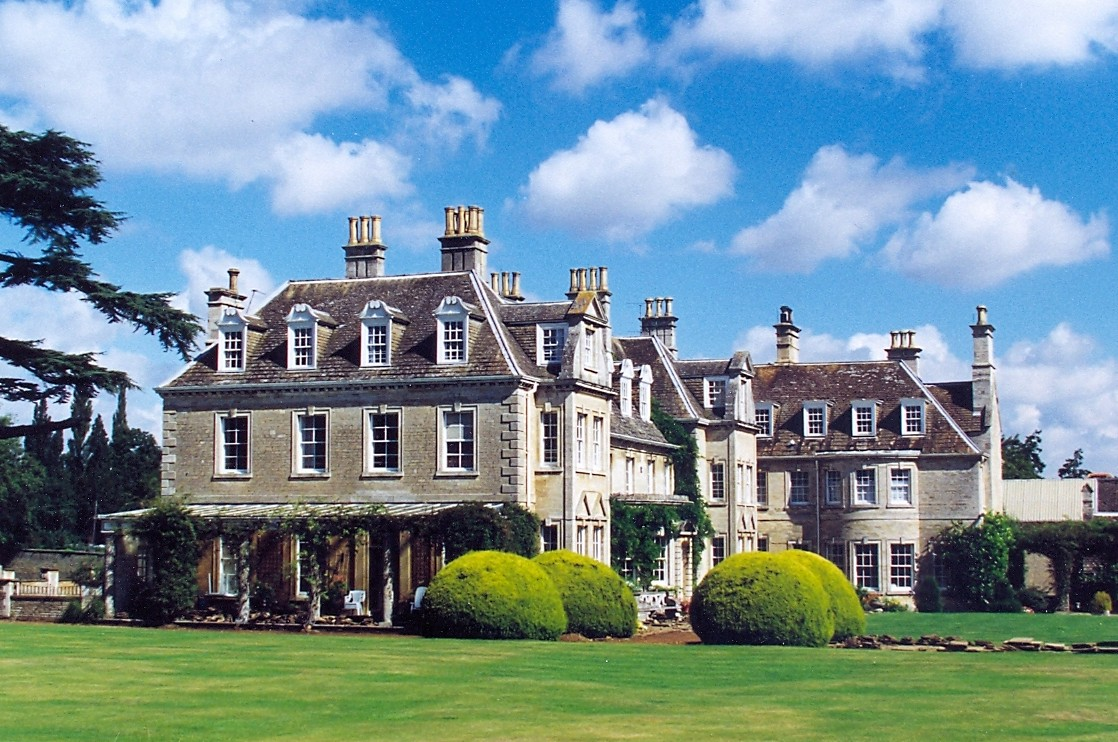

Location
- Witham on the Hill; Bourne, Lincolnshire, PE10 0JJ; England; 52.737912°N 0.445893°W

Information
- Type: Preparatory day and boarding
- Motto: Qui vit content tient assez
- Religious affiliation: Church of England
- Established: 1959
- Founder: J. W. E. ('Bill') Banks JP
- Local authority: Lincolnshire
- Department for Education URN: 120727 Tables
- Head: William S. D. Austen
- Staff: 39
- Gender: Mixed
- Age: 4 to 13
- Enrolment: c. 220
- Houses: Maitland, Banks, Lyons, Tate
- Colours: Red, Blue, Green, Yellow (respectively)
- Website: https://www.withamhall.com

Witham Hall School is a coeducational independent boarding and day preparatory school in Witham on the Hill, Lincolnshire, England.

== The house ==
Witham Hall is a Georgian manor house, that is set in 15 acres of grounds, that was built as a private residence in 1752 by The Rev. Woolsey Johnson (who was a descendant of Robert Johnson, Archdeacon of Leicester, who was the founder of Uppingham School and Oakham School, for both of which Witham Hall School remains a preparatory school). The coat-of-arms of the school is that of Robert Johnson, Archdeacon of Leicester, to whom they were granted in 1594, by Robert Cook, Clarenceux King of Arms. The motto of the school's coat-of-arms is Qui vit content tient assez, which is the Norman French for He who lives happily has enough.

The family of Robert Johnson, Archdeacon of Leicester, had resided in the adjacent village of Witham-on-the-Hill, and Witham Hall was inherited by his descendant Lieutenant-General William Augustus Johnson MP.

The house is described by renowned architectural historian Nikolaus Pevsner in his Buildings of England. The core of the house, consisting of five bays between the east front and the west front, dates from 1752 to 1756, although its style, especially its moulded window surrounds, is characteristic of the earlier 18th century (which has led some observers to miscategorise it as a Queen Anne period building). No features from the Georgian period remain inside.

The exterior was redeveloped, between 1903 and 1905, by Andrew Noble Prentice, who created an H-shaped plan for the house and added a range on the east side. Along the drive, stretching from the west side of the house to the main entrance, is a sequence of three pseudo-Jacobean arches, dating from 1876, 1830, and 1906, respectively. The hall and its arches are Grade II listed buildings.

The gardens were designed by the renowned garden-designer Thomas Hayton Mawson. They constitute an arboretum of rare trees, including pillar oaks, Cedars of Lebanon, and Californian Redwoods. Mawson added the current stables and ice-house and a formal rose-garden behind the walled garden's gates, which were awarded the Premier Prize for ironwork at the 1914 Brussels Exhibition.

There is a brass plaque over the house's front entrance to bless anyone who keeps the house safe and to curse anyone who harms it, which was installed in 1752.

== Subsequent private owners ==
The house was a private residence until 1958. After the Johnson family, the house was owned by the Fenwick family, who were a clergy family from Northumberland, who built the school's squash-court and its outdoor swimming-pool, which was one of the first in England, on the site of which the school's Prep Building was subsequently built. The Fenwick family hosted the playwright Noël Coward at the house, where he commended its library.

From 1930, the house was owned by the musically-connected Crichton-Maitland family, after a member of which, Colonel Makgill Crichton-Maitland (d. 1958), the first of the school's houses, Maitland, which has the colour red, is named. At the house, the Maitland family entertained the composer Sir Walford Davies, who wrote his most famous piece, God Be In My Head, in its study; the pianist Dame Myra Hess; and the conductor Sir Malcolm Sargent.

In 1958, the house was bought by farmer J. W. E. ('Bill') Banks JP, who was an importer of Koni shock-absorbers for sportscars, who was the owner of the nearby Witham-on-the-Hill Manor. The second of the school's houses, Banks, which has the colour blue, is named after him.

Witham Hall School was founded in 1959, but the first headmaster, who was surnamed Wicks, was fired after only 6 months. The house's ballroom was converted into the school's library, and school's Ashley Dormitory was named after Banks's son after Banks decided against naming it after Prince Charles. The 'William Banks' building for the school's Pre-Prep, which was named after Banks, was opened in 1998. Banks died, at the age of 96 years, in 2005, when he had a memorial service at the village's Church of St. Andrew, where he was buried.

== Lyons family ==
The school's renown was built by its second, and longest-serving, headmaster, University of Cambridge -educated Peter Stanley Lyons, who had served as director of music of the Royal Naval College, Greenwich, and as director of music and deputy headmaster of the musically-renowned Wells Cathedral School.

Lyons became the school's headmaster in 1961, and moved to the school with his wife, Bridget, who was the daughter of the choral educator James William Webb-Jones, who had been the headmaster of St George's School, Windsor Castle. Bridget managed Witham Hall School's domestic staff and food: she infamously drove to Stamford on the date that her only son, James Andrew, was due to be born, to collect fresh fish for the school's pupils, before returning to the school to give birth to him. The godmother of Bridget Lyons was Lady Walford Davies, who was first the wife of the composer Sir Walford Davies (who had written his most famous piece, God Be In My Head, in Witham Hall's study), and then the wife of Julian Harold Legge Lambart, vice-provost of Eton College. James William Webb-Jones died at the house in 1965, and is buried, with Bridget's mother Barbara Bindon Moody, who had lived at the house until her death in 1974, in the village's Church of St. Andrew.

Under the Lyons's 28-year leadership, the school's number of pupils increased from 20 at the time at which they started to 150 by the time that they retired in 1989, by which time the school had become a feeder school for Eton College in addition to for the local public-schools Uppingham School, Oakham School, Oundle School, and The Leys School, with all of which it maintains a reciprocal events calendar. The school under the Lyons educated the sons of overseas administrators of the British Empire, who flew as members of the BOAC 'Junior Jet Club' to London and then took the Heart of Midlothian train to nearby Peterborough to enable them to attend the school. The uniforms of the school were tailored by Billings and Edmonds of London.

Lyons boasted that he knew the birthday of every pupil, and founded the school's choir and its tradition of singing from the top of the tower of the village's Church of St. Andrew on Ascension Day. Lyons had the house's stable-block converted into a music-school by Rex Critchlow. It was also under the Lyons's leadership that the school was inspected by the Ministry of Education and was subsequently granted the status of a trust, in 1978; and that the school, after educating the Lyons's two daughters, first admitted girls, in 1983. The Lyons's only son James Andrew also attended the school, where the Lyons kept five black labradors, two other dogs, and pigs. James Andrew Lyons married Joanne S. L. Hipkiss at the school in July 1987.

The third of the school's houses, Lyons, which has the colour green, is named after the Lyons family. The school's original sports-hall (which when it opened in 1987 was one of the largest in the country, and large enough to fit four badminton courts inside) was named the Lyons Hall by the governors and parents of the school in commemoration of the Lyons family. The Lyons also commissioned a miniature railway, by the Stamford Model Engineering Society, that was installed through the woods around the Lyons Hall. The Lyons Hall was demolished in 2016 to create space for a contemporary sports-centre.

The Lyons retired in 1989. Peter Stanley Lyons died in 2006, and had a memorial service at the village's Church of St. Andrew in 2007. His widow Bridget was still living in 2009. The school's Old Boys' Society was founded during the leadership of the Lyons.

During the Lyons's leadership, the Chairman of the Governors of the school was Air Vice-Marshal Robert Michael ('Bobby') Robson (d. 2023), who had been an RAF Avro Vulcan bomber navigator.

The fourth of the school's houses, Tate, which has the colour yellow, is named after John Tate, who was a long-serving mathematics master and deputy headmaster of the school from 1962 until 2000.

== After 1989 ==
The next headmasters of the school were:

D. H. Burston, 1989–1997. During his tenure the Pre-Prep was founded in 1994, and when the country of Sweden wanted to make a documentary about A Day in the Life of an English Boarding School, they chose Witham Hall School as their subject and location.

D. Telfer, 1997–2009. During his tenure the 'William Banks' building for the school's Pre-Prep was opened in 1998; and the school's 200-seat Stimson Hall for the arts (which was named after a family who had served in the school's domestic staff since 1957) was opened, by double Olympic sailing-champion Shirley Robertson, in 2006; and the school's Olympic-sized astroturf was opened, by Olympic gold medallist hockey-player Crista Cullen, in 2008.

A. C. Welch, 2009–2020. During his tenure the school was described as 'a first-rate establishment – almost worth having another baby for' by one parent, and he was voted the best headmaster of a preparatory school by the Tatler in 2016.

W. S. D. Austen, 2020–present.

== Notable alumni ==
- Joshua Leakey VC
- Fergus Cochrane-Dyet OBE (born 1965), diplomat
