= William Wynn Jones =

Welsh and Australian clergyman

The Rt. Rev. William Wynn Jones DD
- Anglican Bishop of Central Tanganyika
- Church: Church of England
- Province: Tanganyika (territory)
- Diocese: Tanganyika (territory)
- See: Tanganyika (territory)
- Installed: 1948
- Term ended: 1950 (by his death)
- Previous posts: Principal of Kongwa Theological College (from 1927); First Headmaster of Arusha European School (from 1941); Chancellor of the Diocese of Tanganyika (from 1941); Assistant Bishop of Central Tanganyika (from 1947); Second Bishop of Central Tanganyika (from 1948)

Orders
- Ordination: 1925 (Deacon); 1926 (Priest)

Personal details
- Born: 10 November 1900 Swansea, Wales
- Died: 29 May 1950 (aged 49) Dar es Salaam, Tanzania
- Buried: Graveyard adjacent to the Anglican Cathedral of Dodoma, Diocese of Central Tanganyika
- Parents: Matthew Tertius Jones (1853 - 1912) (father); Margaret Veal Ford (1860 - 1947) (mother).
- Spouse: Ruth L. Minton Taylor, granddaughter of the Premier of Tasmania Henry Dobson, whom he married during 1933
- Children: 4, including the Tanzanian-born conservative Naomi Wilson OAM (b. 1940), who was a National Party of Australia member of the Legislative Assembly of Queensland from 1995 to 1998
- Education: University of Sydney (BA 1922, MA 1927)

The Rt. Rev. William Wynn Jones (10 November 1900 – 29 May 1950) was Welsh educator and clergyman in New South Wales, Australia, who served as Anglican Bishop of Central Tanganyika, Africa, from 1948 until his death by a car accident in 1950.

== Family ==
William (Bill) Wynn Jones, who was born into an upper middle class family in Swansea, Wales, on 10 November 1900, was the youngest son of the Welsh chartered shipbroker Matthew Tertius Jones (1853 - 1912) who was a partner of the Welsh international chartered shipbrokerage M. Jones and Bro. (1856 - 1942), which had been founded by his grandfather Matthew Jones Junior (b. 1828) and his great-grandfather Matthew Jones Senior (1800 - 1867). Wynn Jones's mother was Margaret Veal Ford (1860 - 1947).

Wynn Jones's five siblings included The Rev. Matthew Kenneth Jones MBE (b. 1891), Rector of St Andrew's Anglican Church, Roseville, Australia, who was taken prisoner, to the P.O.W. Camp Changi, at the fall of Singapore whilst serving as senior chaplain to the Commonwealth armed forces in Malaya; Major Eric Ford Jones MC (b. 1889) of the Royal Field Artillery; Cyril Jones (b. 1891) who emigrated to Victoria, British Columbia; and Jenny Jones (b. 1901).

Wynn Jones's paternal uncle was polyglot Edwin Price Jones (1855 - 1924), who (after a lauded pupillage at the Royal Masonic School, Wood Green) was Vice-Consul for Chile and President of the Swansea Chamber of Commerce. Wynn Jones's cousins included the international chartered shipbroker Ernest William Jones, who inherited M. Jones and Bro. (1856 - 1942), and the same's son the choral educator James William Webb-Jones; and the prominent gynaecologist Arthur Webb-Jones.

=== Father's Suicide ===
Wynn Jones's father Matthew Tertius Jones committed suicide, using 'Prussic acid' (hydrogen cyanide) which he claimed to need to kill a dog, during February 1912. He left a note to his wife that asserted that he had treated her badly and that he had been a poor father to his children.

=== Marriage and Descendants ===
Wynn Jones in 1933 married Ruth L. Minton Taylor, who was a granddaughter of the Premier of Tasmania Henry Dobson and a staff member of Mvumi Girls School. Their two sons and two daughters, who were born at Arusha European School, included the Tanzanian-born conservative Naomi Wilson OAM (b. 1940), who was a National Party of Australia member of the Legislative Assembly of Queensland from 1995 to 1998.

== Education ==
Wynn Jones was educated at Queen's College, Taunton, England, until he accepted the invitation of The Reverend George Chambers to emigrate to Australia, where he in Sydney matriculated at Trinity Grammar School (New South Wales), subsequent to which he received from the University of Sydney a BA in 1922 and an MA in 1927.

He played for the English Jesters Cricket Club, of which his cousin James William Webb-Jones had been a co-founder, and of which his cousin Ernest William Jones was a member.

== Career ==
Wynn Jones in 1921 he joined the staff of Trinity Grammar School as a house and sports master. There is now a school senior house at Trinity Grammar School that is named after him.

He was ordained as a deacon in 1925, and as a priest 1926, and was appointed curate at Holy Trinity, Dulwich Hill, New South Wales, where he was involved in the Boy Scout movement.

He in 1927 joined CMS for missionary service in Central Tanganyika under Bishop Chambers, during which he became Principal of Kongwa Theological College. Wynn Jones was in 1941 appointed as the first headmaster of Arusha European School, then subsequently in 1941 as Chancellor of the Diocese, then in 1947 as Assistant Bishop of Central Tanganyika, then in 1948 as Second Bishop of Central Tanganyika.

He in 1948 attended the Lambeth Conference and he in May 1949 received an Honorary Lambeth Doctorate of Divinity.

== Death ==
Wynn Jones died by a car accident in 1950, and was buried in Dar es Salaam ('haven of peace'), Tanzania. He was reinterred by the Anglican Church of Tanzania in the graveyard adjacent to the Anglican Cathedral in Dodoma.
