= John Brownlee =

John Brownlee may refer to:

- John Brownlee (baritone) (1900–1969), Australian opera singer
- John Brownlee (basketball), retired American basketball player
- John Brownlee (statistician) (1868–1927), British statistician
- John Brownlee (hurdler) (born 1914), American hurdler, 1931 All-American for the Duke Blue Devils track and field team
- John Brownlee, former teacher at Edinburgh Academy
- John Edward Brownlee (1883–1961), Canadian politician, former Premier of Alberta
- John L. Brownlee (born 1965), United States attorney and politician
- Jonny Brownlee (born 1990), British triathlete
- Johnathan Brownlee, film producer

== See also ==
- John Brownlie (born 1952), Scottish footballer
- John Brownlie (hymnist) (born 1857), Scottish hymnist
