= Thine for ever! God of love =

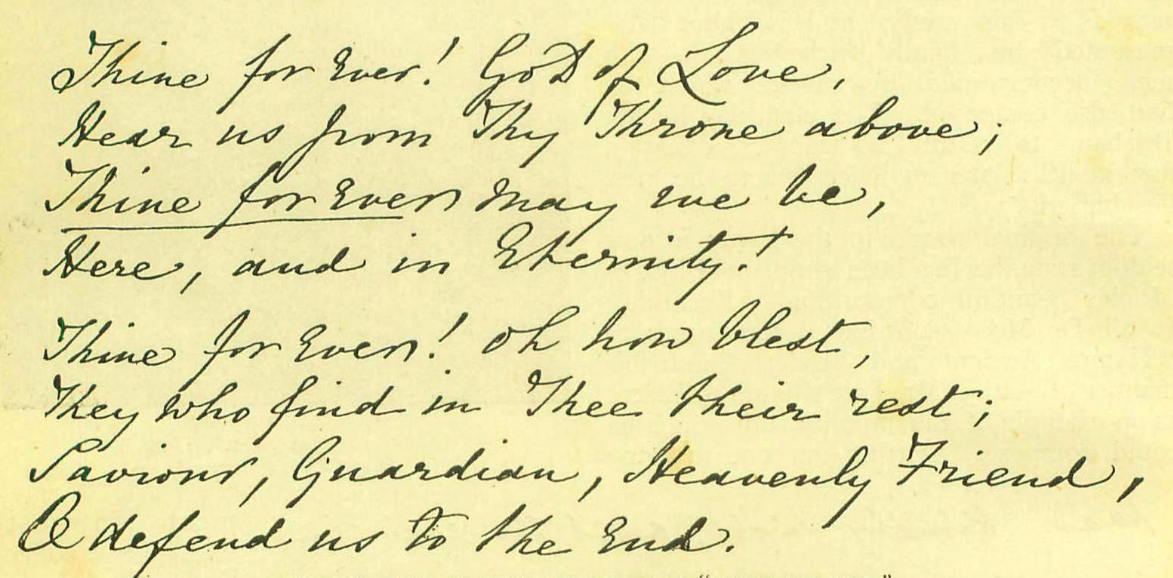
Maude's handwritten hymn, "Thine for ever! God of love"

"Thine for ever! God of love" is an English confirmation hymn. It was written by Mary Fawler Maude in 1847. The original is in seven stanza of four lines. It is usually abbreviated, and stanzas two and three transposed, as in the S.P.C.K. Church Hymns, 1871; the Hymnal Companion; Hymns Ancient and Modern, 1875; Thring's Collection, 1882, and other hymnbooks. As a hymn for Confirmation its use in its day was extensive. The hymn was altered by various editors.

== Origin ==
Maude wrote the story of the hymn for the Rev. John Brownlie:—

"In 1847 my husband was minister of the Parish Church of St. Thomas, Newport, Isle of Wight. We had very large Sunday-schools, in which I taught the first class of elder girls, then preparing for their confirmation by the Bishop of Winchester. Health obliged me to go for some weeks to the seaside, and while there I wrote twelve letters to my class, which were afterward printed by the Church of England Sunday-School Institute. In one of the letters I wrote off, almost impromptu, the hymn Thine for ever." (Note: According to Benson, in the confirmation service in the Church of England, the prayer spoken by the bishop in the act of laying on his hands begins, “Defend, O Lord, this thy Child with thy heavenly grace, that “he may continue thine for ever.” These words furnished the theme for the hymn. In the hymn, they are taken up by catechumens and congregation, and made the words of their own prayer.)
"The hymn must have “been in some way seen by the committee of the Christian Knowledge Society, for early in the fifties I opened their newly-published hymnal, much to my surprise, upon my own hymn. After that, application for its use came in from all quarters. Little did I imagine that it would be chosen by our beloved Queen to be sung at the confirmation of a Royal Princess. It was our custom in Chirk Vicarage to sing a hymn, chosen in turn, at our evening family prayer on the Lord’s Day. On Sunday, February 8th, 1887, it was my husband’s turn to choose, and he gave out Thine for ever, looking round at me. On the 11th, he was dead."

== History ==
Maude's hymn was suited to a confirmation service in the Church of England. In the U.S., the hymn does not seem to have been used in the Episcopal Church until 1872. By that time, it was already becoming familiar in such Presbyterian and Congregational churches as were using Charles Seymour Robinson's Songs for the Sanctuary, published in 1865.

== Uses ==
Nearly fifty years after it was written, it was sung at St Deiniol's Church, Hawarden, by Edward White Benson, Archbishop of Canterbury, two hours before his death, and was also sung at his funeral. It was the favourite hymn of William Plunket, 4th Baron Plunket, Archbishop of Dublin.

== Lyrics ==
1 Thine for ever! God of love,
Hear us from Thy throne above;
Thine for ever may we be
Here and in eternity.

2 Thine for ever! Lord of life,
Shield us through our earthly strife;
Thou, the Life, the Truth, the Way,
Guide us to the realms of day.

3 Thine for ever! O how blest
They who find in Thee their rest!
Saviour, Guardian, heavenly Friend,
O defend us to the end.

4 Thine for ever! Saviour, keep
These Thy frail and trembling sheep;
Safe alone beneath Thy care,
Let us all Thy goodness share.

5 Thine for ever! Thou our Guide,
All our wants by Thee supplied,
All our sins by Thee forgiven,
Lead us, Lord, from earth to heaven.

There were originally a sixth and a seventh verse which were not used in hymnals.

6 Thine for ever! In that day
When the world shall pass away:
When the trumpet’s note shall sound,
And the nations under ground

7 Shall the awful summons hear,
Which proclaims the Judgment near:
Thine for ever! ’Neath Thy wings
Hide and save us, King of kings!”
