= James William Webb-Jones =

Welsh choral educator

Flight lieutenant James William Webb-Jones
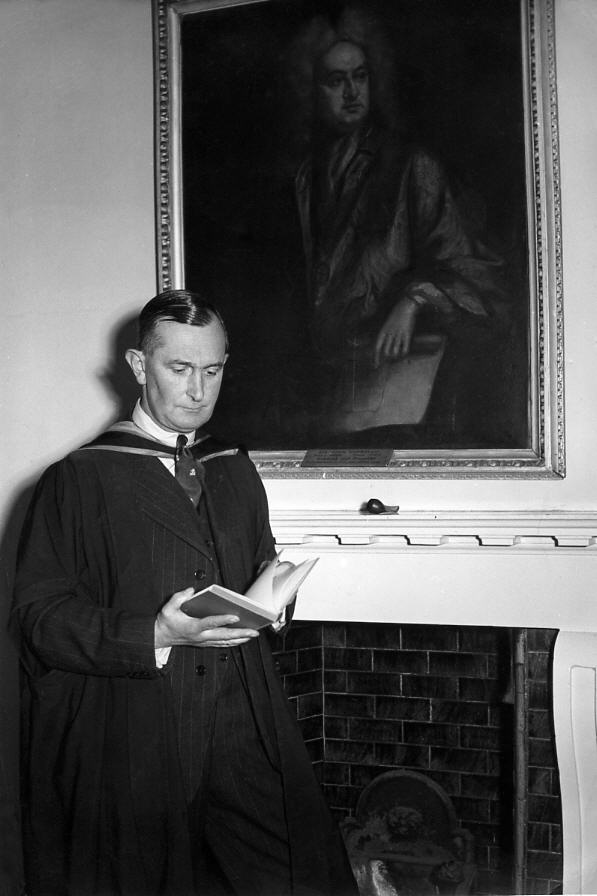
- James William Webb-Jones before a portrait of Sir John Vanbrugh
- Born: 12 February 1904; Cowbridge, Glamorgan, Wales
- Died: 29 December 1965 (aged 61); Witham Hall School, Lincolnshire, England
- Resting place: St. Andrew's Church, Witham on the Hill, England
- Education: Cranleigh School
- Alma mater: Worcester College, Oxford (BA, 1927; MA, 1930); University of Grenoble (Diplôme de Hautes Études, 1927)
- Occupations: Headmaster; cricketer
- Known for: Headmaster of St George's School, Windsor Castle (1934 – 1942); Headmaster of Vanbrugh Castle School (1951 – 1955); Headmaster of Wells Cathedral School (1955 – 1964)
- Spouse(s): Barbara Bindon Moody (whom he married on 20 December 1930 at Windsor, Berkshire), d. of Colonel Richard S. H. Moody
- Children: Bridget Webb-Jones (who married Peter Stanley Lyons on 31 July 1957 at Wells Cathedral)
- Parents: Ernest William Jones (father); Aimée Elizabeth Parson (mother)
- Relatives: James Burton (property developer) (3rd-great grandfather); Lieutenant-Colonel William Matthew Jones VD (grandfather); Arthur Webb-Jones, gynaecologist (uncle); Edwin Price Jones, Vice-Consul for Chile (cousin); William (Bill) Wynn Jones, Bishop of Central Tanganyika (cousin); Major-General James Fitzgerald Martin (brother-in-law); Peter Stanley Lyons (son-in-law).
- Military career
- Allegiance: United Kingdom
- Branch: Administrative and Special Duties Branch; Royal Air Force Education Service
- Service years: 1942-1945
- Rank: Flight lieutenant

Flight lieutenant James William Webb-Jones (1904–1965) (RAF nickname 'Bub Jones') was a Welsh choral educator, and co-founder of the English Jesters Cricket Club, and officer of the RAF Administrative and Special Duties Branch.

Named after his ancestor James Burton Senior (developer of Regent Street, Regent's Park, and Hyde Park), he led numerous historic musical schools, including St George's School, Windsor Castle, Vanbrugh Castle School, and Wells Cathedral School.

He was the son of the international chartered shipbroker and first-class cricketer Ernest William Jones, and the nephew of the prominent gynaecologist Arthur Webb-Jones, and the brother-in-law of the surgeon Major-General James Fitzgerald Martin.

== Family ==
=== Paternal family ===
James William, who was born on 12 February 1904 in Cowbridge, Glamorgan, Wales, was the only child of the international chartered shipbroker Ernest William Jones (1870 – 1941), who was the owner of M. Jones and Bro. (1856 - 1942), who was a first class cricketer. James William's paternal uncle was the prominent gynaecologist Arthur Webb-Jones. James William's paternal grandfather was Lieutenant-Colonel William Matthew Jones VD (1838 - 1921).

James William's paternal cousins included the fellow polyglot Edwin Price Jones (1855 - 1924) who (after a lauded pupillage at the Royal Masonic School, Wood Green) was Vice-Consul for Chile and President of the Swansea Chamber of Commerce; and William (Bill) Wynn Jones, who was Anglican Bishop of Central Tanganyika, through whom James William was a cousin of the National Party conservative Naomi Wilson OAM (b. 1940).

=== Maternal family ===
James William's mother was Aimée Elizabeth Parson (1873 - 1918) who was the French-born third daughter of the banker James Holmes Parson of Le Houlme and Montville, Seine-Maritime, and Jessy Burton.

James William's eldest maternal aunt was Jessie/Jessy Sarah Parson (later Endall) (d. 22 April 1941) who had been selected by Crown Princess Sofia of Greece to be from 1898 Lady Superintendent and Matron of the First Military Hospital at Athens, for which she received the Commemorative Medal of the Red Cross from Queen Olga of Greece. Jessie/Jessy Sarah Parson had been previously Lady Superintendent of the English Hospital at the Piraeus during the Greco-Turkish War (1897), and was latterly, as Jessie/Jessy Sarah Endall, Matron of the Children's Hospital at Athens.

Through his maternal grandmother Jessy Burton (who was the daughter of the solicitor William Warwick Burton and the granddaughter of William Ford Burton) James William was a 3rd-great grandson of the famous London property developer James Burton Senior, and a 2nd-great grandnephew the architect Decimus Burton.

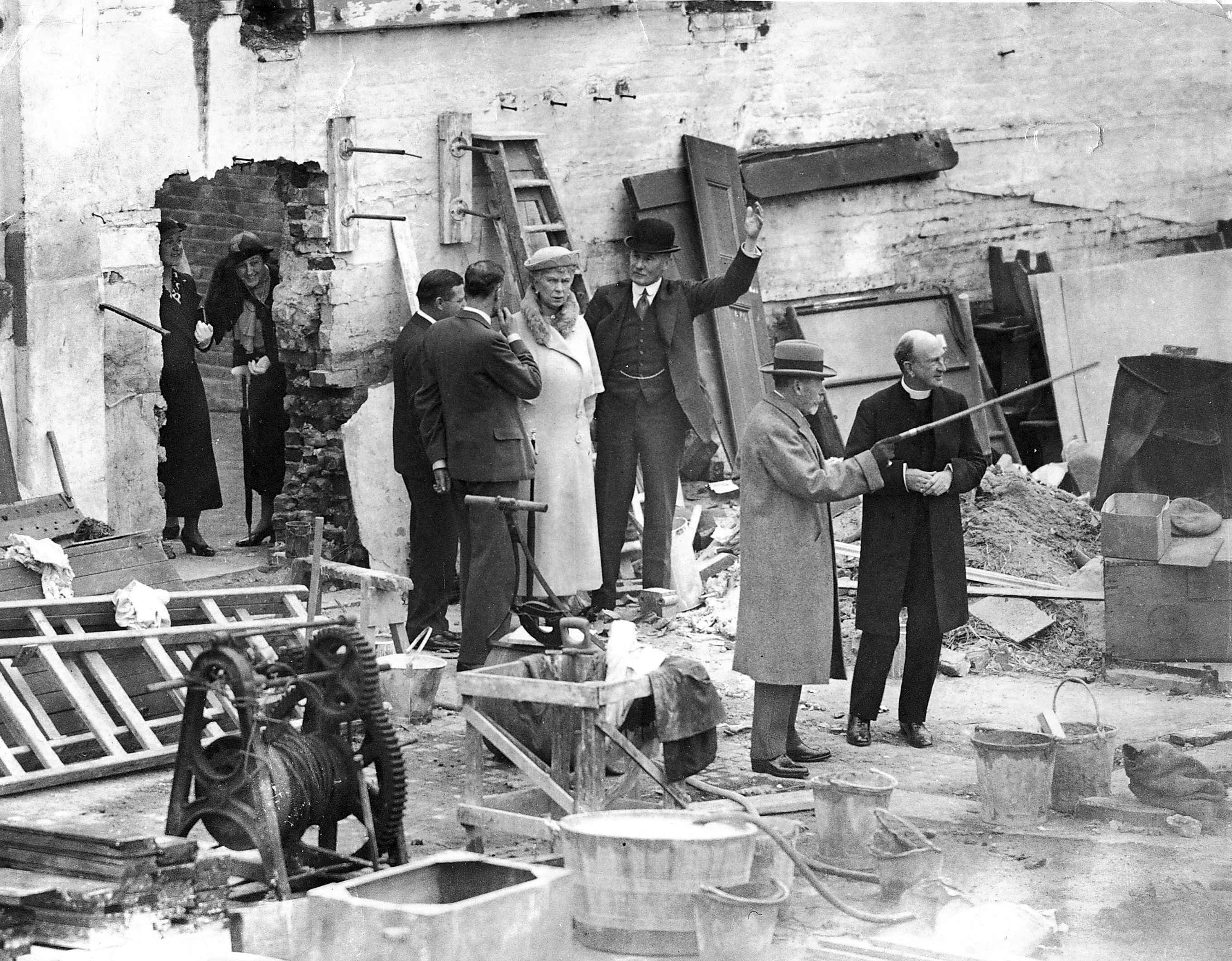
Barbara Bindon Webb-Jones (née Moody) (farthest left) with Queen Mary (centre) and King George V (second from right)

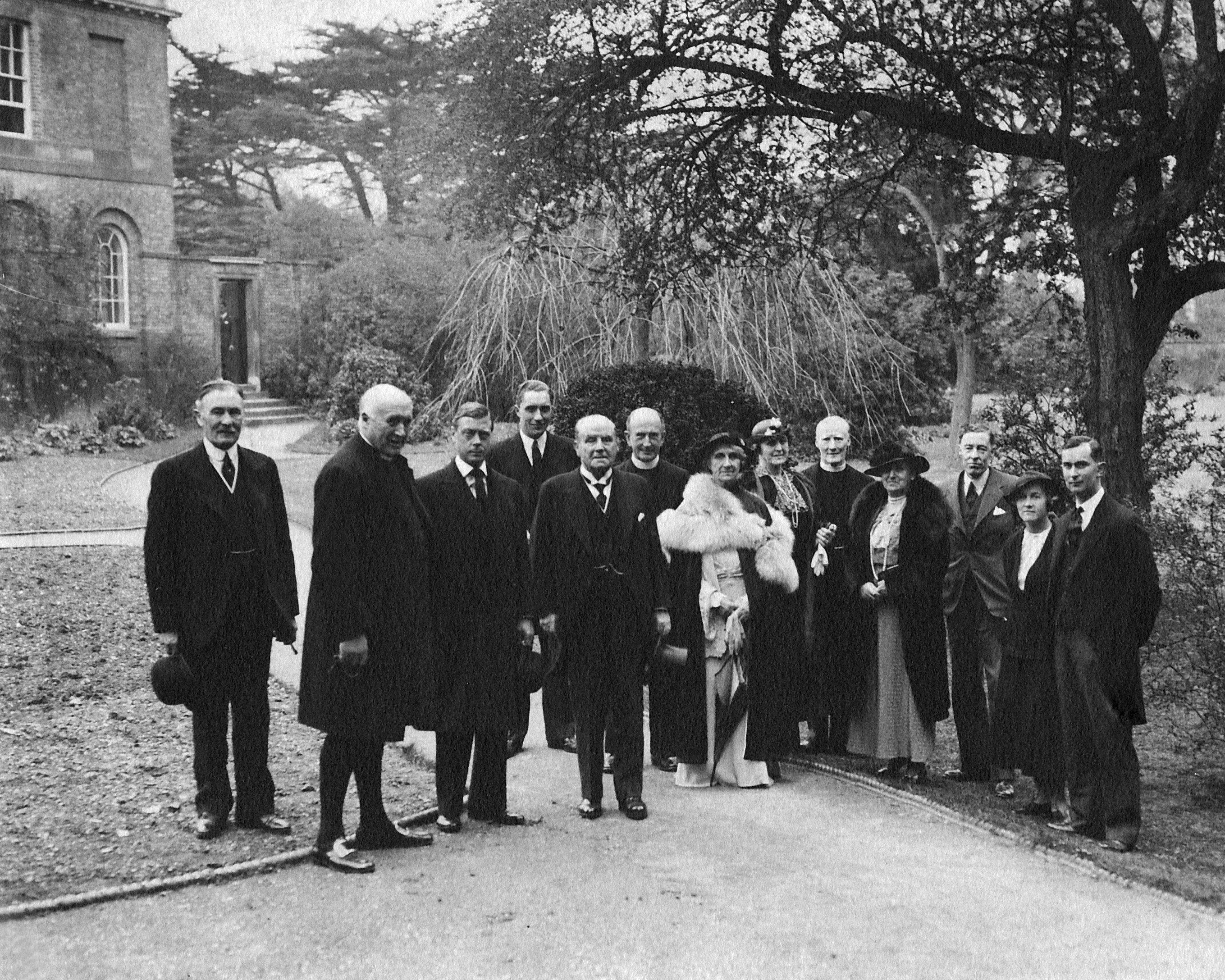
James William Webb-Jones (farthest right) with Edward VIII (third from left)

== Education ==
James William was educated at Cranleigh School, for which he played cricket, and where he received distinctions in French, Ancient Greek, Latin, and Mathematics, and was a School Prefect.

He was then educated at Worcester College, Oxford, at which he matriculated on 13 October 1923 to read classical moderations and Spanish under Arthur Wallace Pickard-Cambridge, and was rusticated for the Michaelmas term of 1925 for lack of academic diligence. He was Captain of Cricket at Worcester College, Oxford.

He spent a fourth year at the University of Grenoble between August 1926 and July 1927, where he received the Diplôme de Hautes Études in June 1927, before he returned to Worcester College, Oxford, to graduate with a BA on 17 December 1927 and an MA in 1930.

=== Co-founder of the Jesters Cricket Club ===
James William during 1928 was a co-founder, with John 'Jock' Forbes Burnet (1910 - 1980) of St. Paul's School, London, of the Jesters Cricket Club, of which his father Ernest, and his cousin William, and his son-in-law Peter, were members.

== Career ==
- Private tutor to the son of the Dean of Windsor, from 1927 to 1928.
- Assistant Headmaster of St George's School, Windsor Castle, from 1928 to 1934.
- Headmaster of St George's School, Windsor Castle, from 1934 to 1942.
- He left St George's School in 1942, to serve in the Royal Air Force during World War II, from 1942 to 1945, as a flight lieutenant of the Administrative and Special Duties Branch and a member of the Royal Air Force Education Service stationed at RAF North Luffenham. His RAF nickname was 'Bub Jones'.
- Housemaster, Wellington School, Somerset, from 1945 to 1950.
- Headmaster of Vanbrugh Castle School from 1951 to 1955.
- Headmaster of Wells Cathedral School from 1955 to 1964, where his son-in-law Peter Stanley Lyons was Director of Music from 1954 to 1960. James William also worked as a sidesman at Wells Cathedral, and a member of the Friends of Wells Cathedral, and a member of the Confraternity of St. Andrew.
- Teacher at All Hallows Preparatory School, Cranmore, Somerset, during 1964 and 1965.

He was fined during February 1959, at Shepton Mallet Magistrates Court, for driving a car without due care and attention.

== Personal life ==
=== Marriage ===
James William married, at the Parish Church, Windsor, on 20 December 1930, Barbara Bindon Moody (1903 - 1974), of Emperor's Gate, South Kensington, who was the daughter of Colonel Richard Stanley Hawks Moody CB and the granddaughter of Major-General Richard Clement Moody (who was the founder and the first Lieutenant-Governor of British Columbia). They had only one child, Bridget (b. 5 September 1937), who married the choral musician Peter Stanley Lyons at Wells Cathedral in 1957.

The godmother of Bridget Webb-Jones was Lady Walford Davies, who was secretary of the Windsor and Eton Choral Society, and the wife of the composer Sir Henry Walford Davies KCVO OBE (who had been Master of the King's Music at St George's Chapel, Windsor Castle, when James William had been Headmaster of St George's School, Windsor Castle). Lady Walford Davies subsequently married Julian Harold Legge Lambart, who was Vice-Provost of Eton College, for which Witham Hall School is a preparatory school.

=== Retirement and death ===
James William and his wife, Barbara Bindon, retired to Witham Hall, where his son-in-law Peter Stanley Lyons was Headmaster of the School from 1961 to 1989. James William's hobbies were cricket, fives, fishing, reading, and wine. He kept a wine store in the basement of Vanbrugh Castle, and died from kidney failure, possibly as a consequence of alcoholism, during 1965 when he was aged only 61 years. He is buried at The Church of St. Andrew, Witham on the Hill, where his funeral was held, and had a memorial service at Wells Cathedral. His wife Barbara Bindon died on 18 October 1974 and was buried next to her husband.

== Ancestry ==
Ancestors of James William Webb-Jones

8. Matthew Jones Senior (1800 – 1867) of Glamorgan
4. Lieutenant-Colonel William Matthew Jones VD
9. Sarah Baugh (1802 - 1876)
2. Ernest William Jones (eldest brother of gynaecologist Arthur Webb-Jones)
5. Agnes Ida Long (1845 - 1899)
1. James William Webb-Jones
24. The Rev. James Freakes Parson
12. George John Parson of Adelphi Terrace (engineer)
6. James Holmes Parson of Le Houlme and Montville, Seine-Maritime
13. Anna Maria Holmes
3. Aimée Elizabeth Parson (sister of Jessie/Jessy Sarah Parson (later Endall))
28. William Ford Burton (eldest child of James Burton (property developer) and eldest sibling of Decimus Burton)
14. William Warwick Burton (brother of Henry Marley Burton)
29. Mary Moore (b. 1784)
7. Jessy Burton
15. Mary Elizabeth Shalless (daughter of shipwright Thomas Shalless)
