= Arthur Webb-Jones =

Welsh gynaecologist

Arthur Webb-Jones FRCS LRCP BS MD

Personal details
- Born: 1875 Glamorgan, Wales
- Died: 30 April 1917 (aged 41–42)
- Spouse: Lillian Bell Wakeman-Long (1875 – 1907) (married 1906)
- Children: 3, including Arthur Webb-Jones (1917 - 1965) FRCS, M.B., B.S., of the Royal Air Force and Captain of the Royal Army Medical Corps
- Parents: Lieutenant-Colonel William Matthew Jones VD (b. 1838) (father); Agnes Ida Long (1845 – 1899) (mother)
- Relatives: Ernest William Jones, Welsh international chartered shipbroker (elder brother); James William Webb-Jones, Welsh choral educator (nephew); Edwin Price Jones, Welsh Vice-Consul for Chile and Secretary to the Chamber of Commerce (cousin); William Wynn Jones, Welsh Anglican Bishop of Central Tanganyika (cousin)
- Education: Malvern College
- Alma mater: St Thomas' Hospital; University of London
- Occupation: Gynaecologist; Physician
- Known for: Lumbar Hernia (The Lancet 1902); Two Cases of Gynaecomastia (The Lancet 1904); Bilharziosis in Women (University of London M.D. Thesis 1913)

Military service
- Allegiance: United Kingdom
- Branch/service: British Egyptian Army
- Years of service: 1900 - 1916

Arthur Webb-Jones FRCS LRCP (1875 – 30 April 1917) was a Welsh gynaecologist who served with the British Army in Egypt. He was the father of the distinguished surgeon Arthur Webb-Jones FRCS (1917 - 1965) of the same name.

== Family ==
Arthur, who was born in Glamorgan to an upper middle class family, was the younger son of Lieutenant-Colonel William Matthew Jones VD (1838 - 1921), of the 1st Swansea Corps of the 1st Glamorganshire Artillery Volunteers, who was a founder and owner of the international chartered shipbrokerage M. Jones and Bro. (1856 - 1942). Arthur's mother was Agnes Ida Long (1845 – 1899).

Arthur's eldest sibling Ernest William Jones (1870 - 1941) inherited the international chartered shipbrokerage M. Jones and Bro. and was a first-class cricketer. Arthur's nephew through his elder brother Ernest was the choral educator James William Webb-Jones.

Arthur's cousins included polyglot Edwin Price Jones (1855 - 1924), who (after a lauded pupillage at the Royal Masonic School, Wood Green) was Vice-Consul for Chile, and President of the Swansea Chamber of Commerce; and William (Bill) Wynn Jones, who was Anglican Bishop of Central Tanganyika from 1946 until his death by car accident in 1951.

== Career ==
Malvern College

Arthur Webb-Jones was educated at Malvern College (1890 - 1893, School Prefect), and at St Thomas' Hospital, and at the University of London (LRCP, 1899; B.S., 1911; M.D., 1913), where the subject of his M.D. thesis was Bilharziosis in Women.

His notable published works include Lumbar Hernia (The Lancet, 1902, ii, 747)) and Two Cases of Gynaecomastia (Ibid, 1904, i, 865). He became a Fellow of the Royal College of Surgeons of England on 31 May 1900.

Webb-Jones from 1900 to 1904 served in the British Egyptian Army in the Sudan, where he subsequently settled and established a private practice at Rue Stamboul, Alexandria, and was appointed Surgeon and Gynaecologist to the Government Hospital and Medical Officer to the Egyptian State Railway, Alexandria District. He received the thanks of the Sirdar and Governor-General of the Sudan for his services. He resided in Egypt from 1913 to 1917.

Webb Jones during the Gallipoli Campaign served in the yeomanry of the British Army from May 1915 to December 1916.

When, in spring 1917, there occurred epidemic of typhus in Alexandria, Webb-Jones gave an intravenous injection of saline solution to another practitioner, who was dying from typhus, by which he fatally infected himself, a consequence of which he died eleven days later on 30 April 1917. His death warranted a mention in a special intelligence report to the Houses of Parliament, which was published in The Lancet.

== Marriage ==
Arthur Webb-Jones married Lillian Bell Wakeman-Long (1875 – 1907) in 1906 by whom he had three children:

1. Francis Arthur John Webb-Jones (later Wakeman-Long) (b. 21 October 1910, Marylebone, London – d. 1986, Dover) who changed his surname to Wakeman-Long for his marriage. Francis was a barrister who served as a Chairman of the family international chartered shipbroker M. Jones and Bro. (1856 - 1942) until its dissolution, as a consequence of the Second World War, in 1942.
2. Marjorie Agnes Webb-Jones (1912 – 2005) Married Lionel C. Lord Sept 1935 at Kensington.
3. Arthur Junior (17 June 1917, Alexandria – 20 January 1965, Hartlepool) FRCS. He received the degrees of M.B and B.S. at St Thomas' Hospital during 1940. He served with the Royal Air Force in West Africa during the Second World War, after which he received the F.R.C.S.Ed. and a Fellowship during 1948. He was a Captain in the Royal Army Medical Corps. He worked at Manchester Royal Infirmary and Royal Victoria Infirmary, Newcastle upon Tyne, before he moved to Hartlepools and Sedgefield General Hospital during 1950. He was a member of the Hand Club of Great Britain. He was a cricketer who Captained West Hartlepool's senior eleven for three seasons. He married Doreen Ariadne Elwood (1921 – 2016) by whom he had three children.
