= Peter Stanley Lyons =

English chorister, choral musician, and headmaster (1927–2006)

- Born: 6 December 1927; London, England
- Died: 28 November 2006 (aged 78); Exeter, England
- Education: St John's College, Cambridge (BA, 1950; MA, 1955)
- Occupations: Director of music, Royal Naval College, Greenwich (1950–1954); Director of music, Wells Cathedral School (1954–1960); Master of choristers, Wells Cathedral (1954–1960); Headmaster, Witham Hall School (1961–1989)
- Spouse: Bridget Webb-Jones (m. 31 July 1957)
- Relatives: James William Webb-Jones (father-in-law)
- Musical career
- Genres: Choral music; Italian opera
- Instruments: Voice; Keyboard
- Years active: 1944–1961
- Military career
- Allegiance: United Kingdom
- Branch: Royal Corps of Signals; Royal Artillery
- Service years: 1946–1948; 1955; 1958.
- Rank: Lieutenant

Peter Stanley Lyons (6 December 1927 – 28 November 2006) was a renowned English choral musician of the Choir of St John's College, Cambridge.

He served as director of music at Royal Naval College, Greenwich; director of music at the musically renowned Wells Cathedral School; and as an historic headmaster of Witham Hall School.

== Early life ==
Lyons was born, on 6 December 1927, at 16 Atherfold Road, SW9, London, to Harold Leslie Lyons (16 December 1898 – 19 November 1967). Harold Leslie Lyons was a sugar-boiler manufacturer during his twenties before being appointed the sommelier at London's Savoy Hotel and Dorchester Hotel.

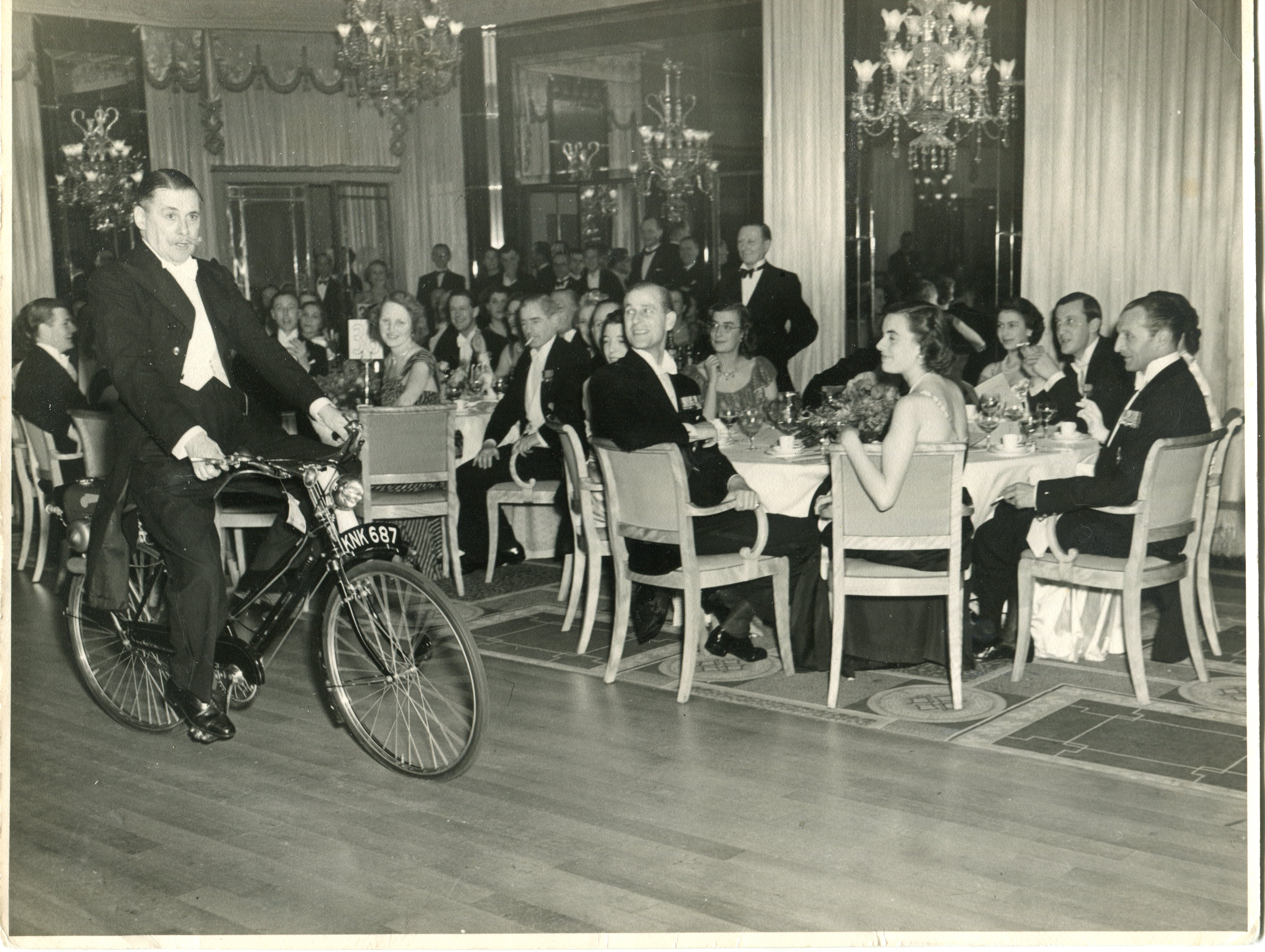
Peter's father Harold Leslie Lyons (standing in front of the pillar), sommelier at the Savoy Hotel and Dorchester Hotel, with Prince Philip, Patricia Mountbatten/Knatchbull (seated to Philip's right), and Princess Margaret (seated opposite Philip), c. 1955

His mother was Teresa Gadsden (b. 23 July 1902), whom his father had married at Wandsworth during 1927. He had one younger brother Leslie D. Lyons. He was bought a house, No. 22, on the same road as his father, where he lived until his graduation from Cambridge.

== Education ==
Lyons was educated at Haselrigge Road School, Alleyn's School, Rossall School, and at St John's College, Cambridge. At Alleyn's, he was a house prefect, received colours for soccer and cricket, and played the violin. At Rossall, he was captain of soccer, studied music, French, English, and German, sung soprano, and was described as a "forerunner of Maria Callas". His performances included the part of Euridice in Gluck's Orfeo ed Euridice, and the soprano part in Verdi's Requiem. He was broadcast on the BBC on 8 February 1944, when he sung an aria from Mozart's Don Giovanni.

He won a choral scholarship to Cambridge in 1946, but completed National Service in the Royal Corps of Signals, with whom he boxed for the British Army, and in the Royal Regiment of Artillery, before he in 1948 matriculated at St John's College, Cambridge, which he chose over Trinity College, Cambridge, because of the former's superior choir. He read Modern and Medieval Languages (viz. French and Italian) (BA 1950, MA 1955) and was tutored by Claude Guillebaud. He was awarded St. John's colours for soccer during the 1949–1950 season, and was a member of the team that won the Intercollegiate Cup for soccer, and captained Rossall School's Old Boys 1st XI at soccer.

He was a renowned member of the Choir of St John's College, Cambridge, under Robin Orr, in which he sung tenor. He enjoyed the compositions of W. S. Gilbert and Arthur Sullivan. He formed at Alleyn's School a lifetime friendship with John Lanchbery (who would become principal conductor of the Royal Ballet from 1959 to 1972) and with Kenneth Spring (who would become co-founder of the National Youth Theatre of Great Britain). He was also a friend of Cambridge musicologist Peter le Huray (for whom he obtained the job of Sunday organist at Vanbrugh Castle School between 1951 and 1954).

His favourite sport was cricket: he was a member of the Marylebone Cricket Club, for which he played during the 1960s; and of the Jesters Cricket Club, of which his father-in-law James William Webb-Jones was a co-founder; and of the Dulwich Public Schools Association.

== Career ==
Lyons was:

1. Chorister of the Choir of St John's College, Cambridge (1948–1950).
2. Director of music, Royal Naval College, Greenwich (1950–1954) (at which he replaced the Cathedral Psalter with the Anglo-Norman Oxford Psalter).
3. Director of music, Vanbrugh Castle School, (1950–1954) (with musicologist Peter le Huray as Sunday organist).
4. Director of music and deputy headmaster, Wells Cathedral School, and master of the choristers, Wells Cathedral, (1954–1960). (He received the rank of second lieutenant in the Royal Regiment of Artillery during 1955, and attended King George VI Memorial Leadership Training Course, Command Study Centre, 21 Platoon, Saighton Camp, during 1958).
5. Headmaster, Witham Hall School, (1961–1989).
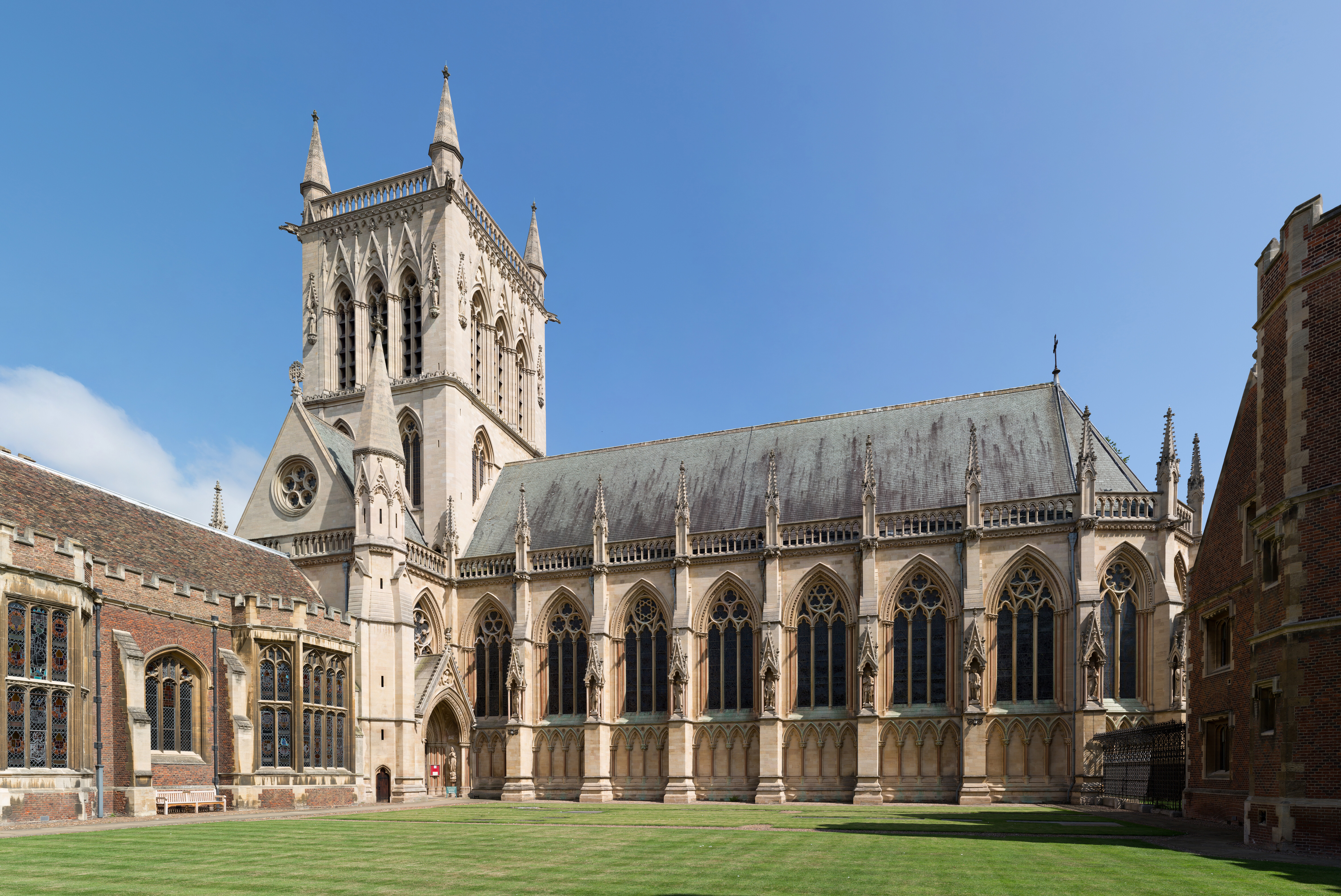
Choir of St John's College, Cambridge

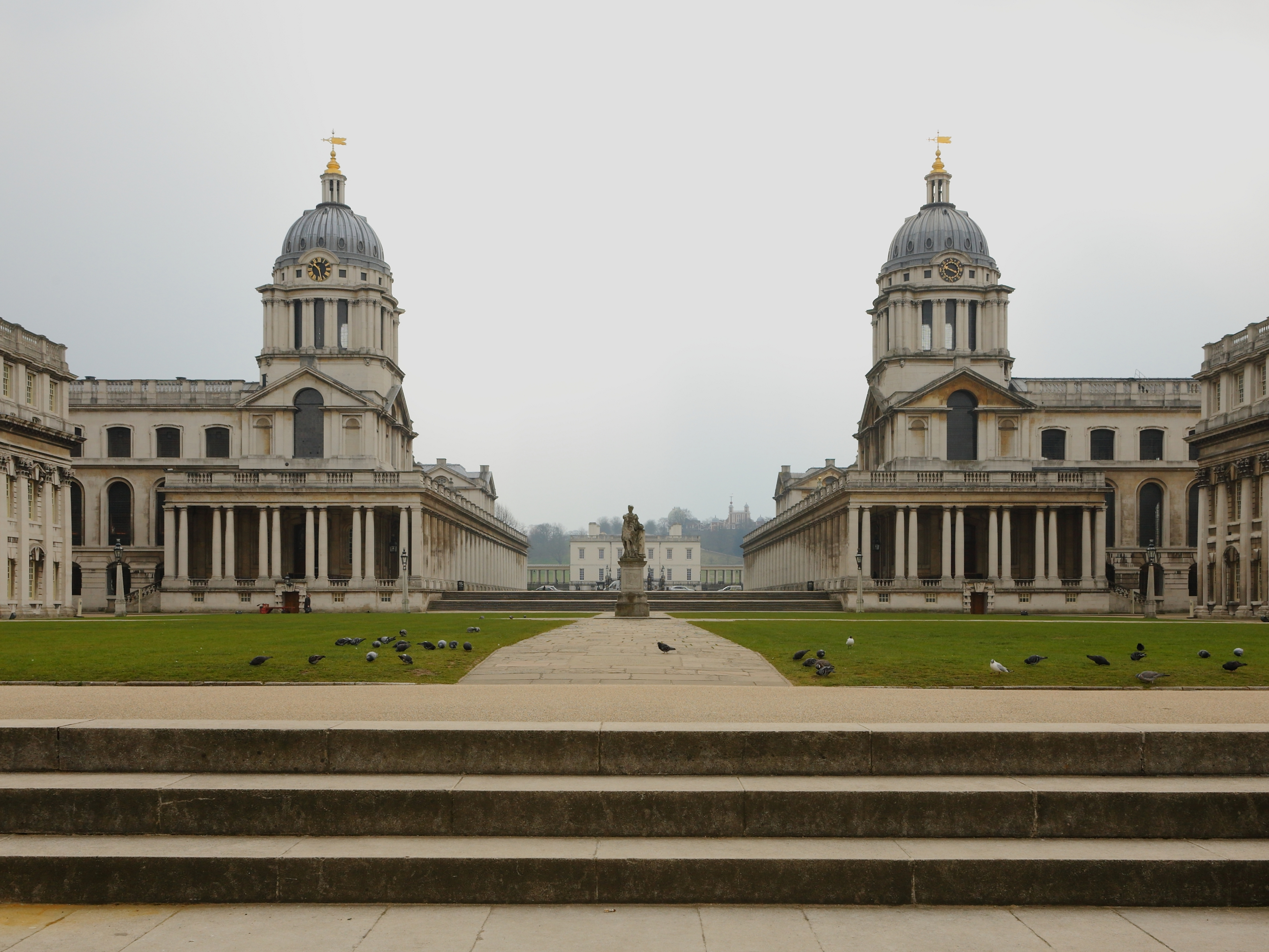
Royal Naval College, Greenwich

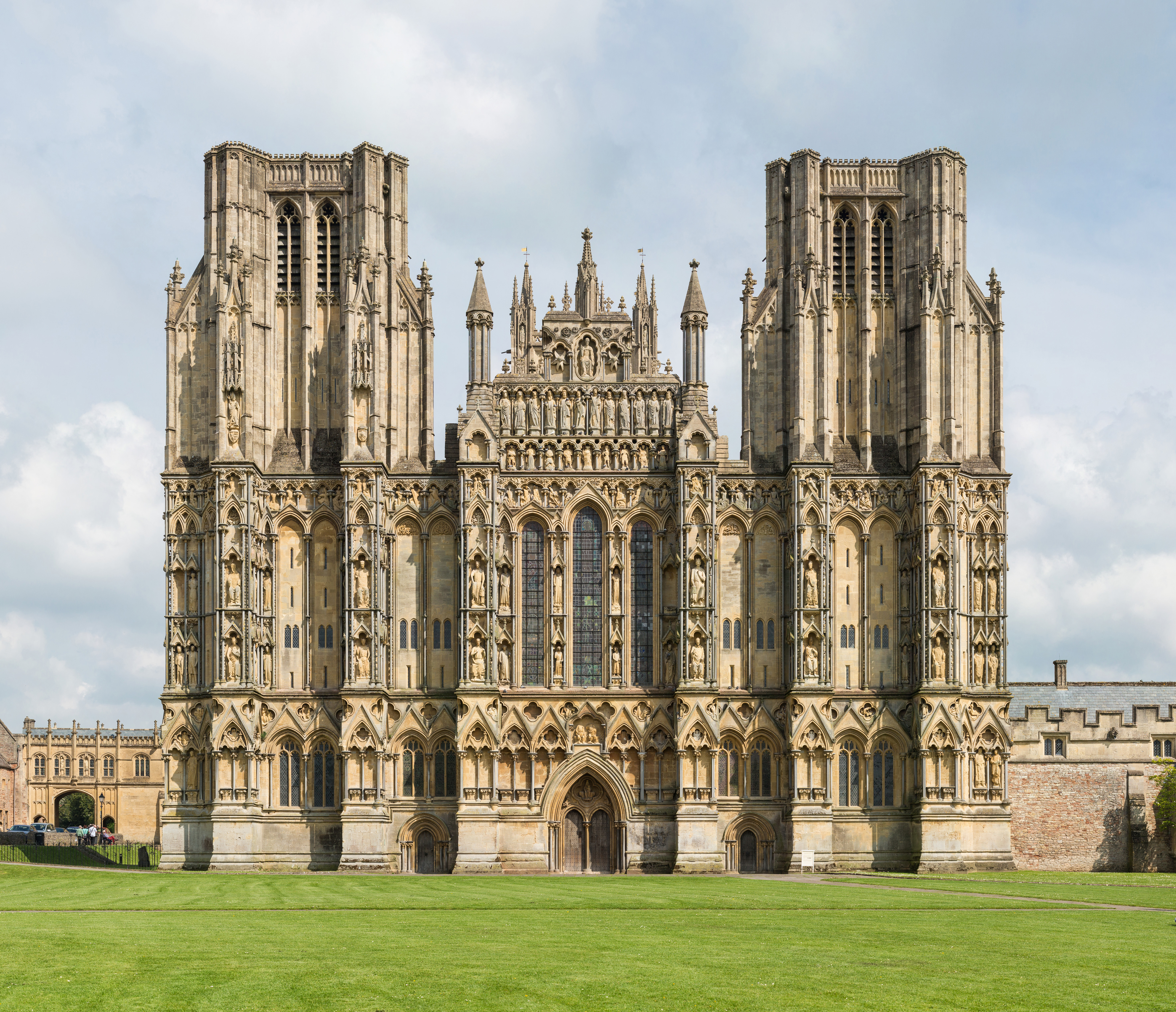
Wells Cathedral

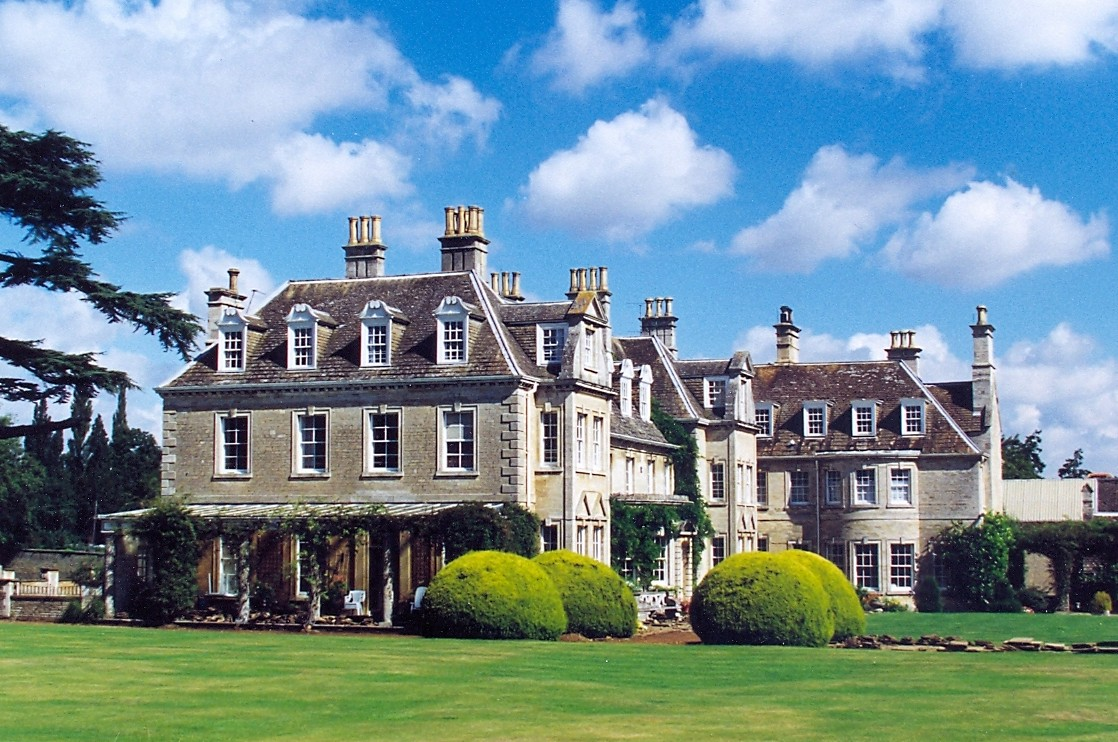
Witham Hall School

== Witham Hall School ==
Lyons was the second and longest-serving headmaster of Witham Hall School, from 1961 to 1989, during which time its number of pupils increased from 20 to 150 and it became a feeder school for Eton College in addition to for the local public-schools Uppingham School, Oakham School, Oundle School, and The Leys School, with all of which it maintains an events calendar. The school under the Lyons educated the sons of overseas administrators of the British Empire, who flew as members of the BOAC 'Junior Jet Club' to London and then took the Heart of Midlothian train to nearby Peterborough to enable them to attend Witham Hall School.

Lyons had moved to the school with his wife, Bridget, who was the daughter of the choral educator James William Webb-Jones, who had been the headmaster of St George's School, Windsor Castle. Bridget managed Witham Hall School's domestic staff and food: she infamously drove to Stamford on the date that her only son, James Andrew, was due to be born, to collect fresh fish for the school's pupils, before returning to the school to give birth to him.

Bridget Lyons's godmother was Lady Walford Davies, who was secretary of the Windsor and Eton Choral Society, and the wife of composer Sir Henry Walford Davies who was Master of the King's Music from 1934 until 1941. Davies had composed his famous choral piece God Be in My Head at Witham Hall. Lady Davies subsequently married Julian Harold Legge Lambart, vice-provost of Eton College, for which Witham Hall School is a preparatory school.

Lyons knew the birthday of every pupil, and founded the school's choir and its tradition of singing from the top of the tower of the adjacent village's Church of St. Andrew on Ascension Day. Lyons had the house's stable-block converted into a music-school by Rex Critchlow. It was also under the Lyons's leadership that the school was inspected by the Ministry of Education and was subsequently granted the status of a Trust, in 1978; and that the school (after educating the Lyons's two daughters) first admitted girls, in 1983.

The third of the school's houses, Lyons, is named after the Lyons family. The school's original sports-hall (which when it opened in 1987 was one of the largest in the country) was named the Lyons Hall by the governors and parents of the school in commemoration of the Lyons. The Lyons also commissioned a miniature railway, by the Stamford Model Engineering Society, that was installed through the woods around the Lyons Hall. The Lyons Hall was demolished in 2016 to create space for a contemporary sports-centre. Except for their daughter-in-law Joanne ('JSL'), the Lyons retired in 1989. The school's Old Boys' Society was founded during the leadership of the Lyons.

== Marriage ==
On 31 July 1957, at Wells Cathedral, Lyons married Bridget Webb-Jones, who was the only child of the choral educator James William Webb-Jones and of Barbara Bindon Moody (who was the daughter of Colonel Richard Stanley Hawks Moody CB, and the granddaughter of Major-General Richard Clement Moody who was the founder of British Columbia).

A bridesmaid was the bride's maternal grandcousin Susan Holford, who, like the bride, was a great-granddaughter of Richard Clement Moody.

Both of Bridget Lyons's parents died at Witham Hall and are buried at The Church of St. Andrew, Witham on the Hill.

=== Issue ===
Lyons and his wife Bridget had two daughters and one son, all of whom were educated at Witham Hall School. They have four grandchildren.

They kept five black labradors, two other dogs, and pigs, at Witham Hall School.

Their eldest daughter Arabella Mary, who received her secondary education at Stamford High School, read English Literature at St Anne's College, Oxford. Their younger daughter Virginia Clare and their only son James Andrew suffered severe skull injuries in a car accident, near Stretton, Rutland, during October 1976. Their only son James Andrew married Joanne S. L. Hipkiss during July 1987.

== Retirement and death ==
Lyons was a member of the Young Musicians Support Group of the Dartington Hall Trust of which Imogen Holst (who was the only child of the composer Gustav Holst) was a member.

Lyons died, of brain cancer, at Exeter, on 28 November 2006, and had a memorial service in 2007 at the Church of St. Andrew, Witham on the Hill, which is adjacent to the school whose renown he had built. His widow Bridget was still living in 2009.
