= Mary Fawler Maude =

English hymnwriter (1819–1913)

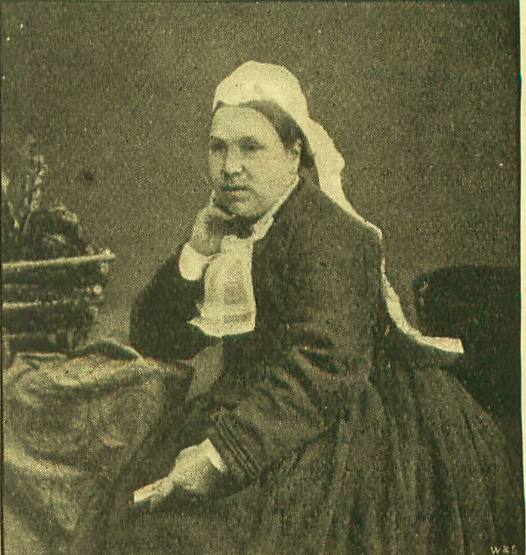
- Born: Mary Fawler Hooper; October 25, 1819; London, England
- Died: July 30, 1913 (aged 93); Overton, Cheshire, England
- Occupations: author; hymnwriter
- Spouse: Joseph Maude (m. 1841; died 1887)
- Writing career
- Notable work: "Thine for ever! God of love"

Signature
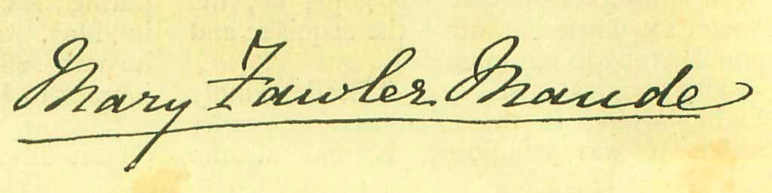

Mary Fawler Maude (1819–1913) was an English village pastor's wife who wrote several religious books and hymns. She is best known for a confirmation hymn, "Thine for ever! God of love", written in 1847.

== Early life ==
Mary Fawler Hooper was born on 25 October 1819, in London.

She was the daughter of George H. Hooper, of Stanmore, Middlesex. She traced her descent from the family of Bishop John Hooper, a Protestant martyr.

In 1841, she married the Rev. Canon Joseph Maude (d. 1887), who, at the time they first met, was curate of St George's, Bloomsbury, and who was pastor of Newport, Isle of Wight, from 1842 to 1852, afterwards being appointed Vicar of Chirk, near Ruabon, by Dr. Short, Bishop of St Asaph, who had been his rector at St. George's. Her husband became Honorary Canon of St. Asaph.

Her husband's father, the Rev. Joseph Maude, was for some years one of the clergy at Carisbrooke, Isle of Wight. Several of Maude's children were born in the Isle of Wight.

== Career ==
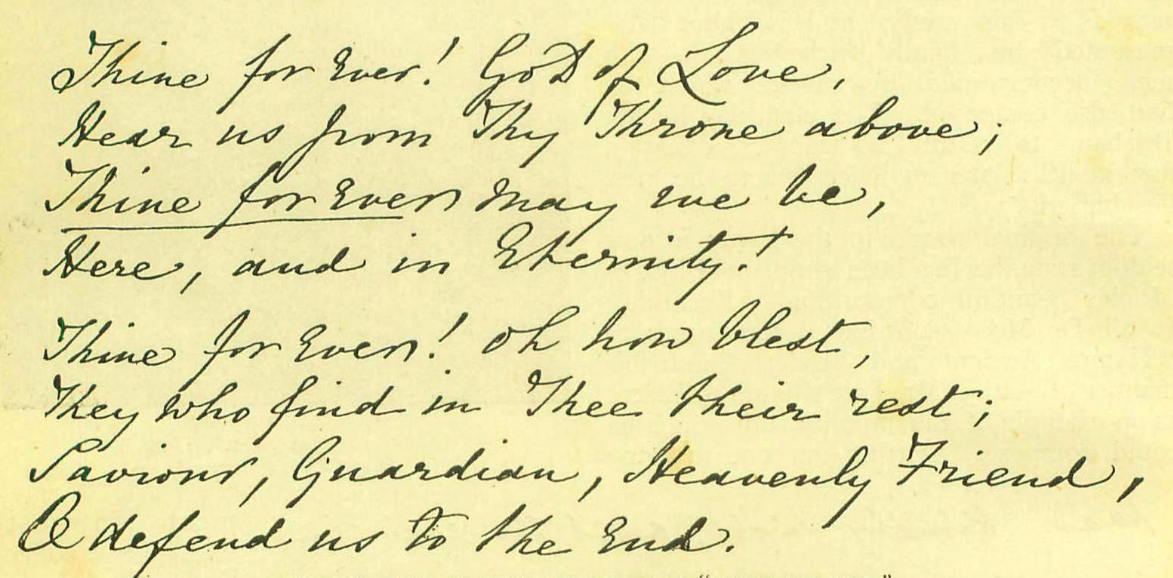
Maude's handwritten hymn, "Thine for ever! God of Love"

The hymn that made Maude's name familiar to many church people of her day begins with, "Thine for ever! God of love". The hymn was written in 1847 for Maude's class in the girls' Sunday school at St. Thomas, Newport Isle of Wight, as a confirmation hymn. It found acceptance in many countries, and was included in almost all collections. It did not, however, escape alteration at the hands of various editors. Maude's life was not that of a "woman of letters", or one lived in the public eye. She was the wife of a village pastor, and she shared in his work. Her hymn represents her one point of contact with the larger public.

Maude's hymns were published in her Twelve Letters on Confirmation, 1848, and in Memorials of Past Years, 1852. Her prose works, Scripture Manners and Customs, Scripture Natural History, and Scripture Topography (2 volumes), were published by the S.P.C.K. The first collection of her poems, entitled Memories of Past Years, was published at Newport, Isle of Wight, in 1852. She and her husband were then just leaving that Parish, after ten years' residence there, and it is prefaced by a valedictory address to the Teachers and Children of the Newport National, Sunday, and Blue Schools.

On the occasion of the annual treat given to the children of these schools, Maude was accustomed to write verses to be sung by them. The year 1848 was one of widespread unrest and disquiet, and the children sang two verses from one of Miss M. A. Stodart's National Ballads, and also three additional verses specially written for them by Maude. Queen Victoria and the Royal Children unexpectedly drove from Osborne House through Newport to Carisbrooke Castle, and, as they returned, the school children, lining the roadway, sang the verses, which were afterwards forwarded to Osborne by the Mayor of Newport.

== Death ==
Mary Fawler Maude died on 30 July 1913, in Overton, Cheshire.

== Selected works ==
Scripture topography

=== Books ===
- Extracts from the Works of Travellers, 1841 (text)
- Twelve Letters on Confirmation, 1848
- Scripture Natural History, 1848 (text)
- Scripture Topography, 1849 (text)
- Memorials of Past Years, 1852
- Scripture Manners and Customs (text)

=== Hymns ===
- "Thine for ever! God of love."
- "A Parable."
- "In the old hall, Chirk Castle."
