= Witham on the Hill =

Village and civil parish in Lincolnshire, England

Coordinates: 52.73616°N 0.44102°W

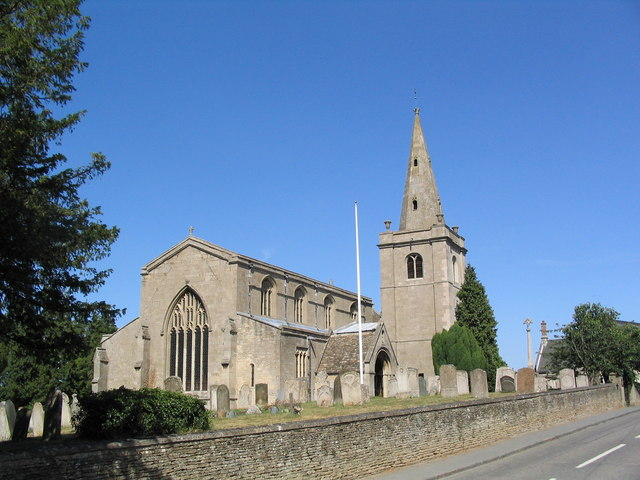
- St Andrew, Witham on the Hill

- Location within Lincolnshire
- Population: 260 (2011 census)
- OS grid reference: TF053165
  - London: 85 mi (137 km) SSE
- Civil parish: Witham on the Hill
- District: South Kesteven
- Shire county: Lincolnshire
- Region: East Midlands
- Country: England
- Sovereign state: United Kingdom
- Post town: BOURNE
- Postcode district: PE10
- Dialling code: 01778
- Police: Lincolnshire
- Fire: Lincolnshire
- Ambulance: East Midlands
- UK Parliament: Grantham and Stamford

Witham on the Hill is a village and civil parish in the South Kesteven district of Lincolnshire, England. The population of the civil parish was 260 at the 2011 census.

== History ==
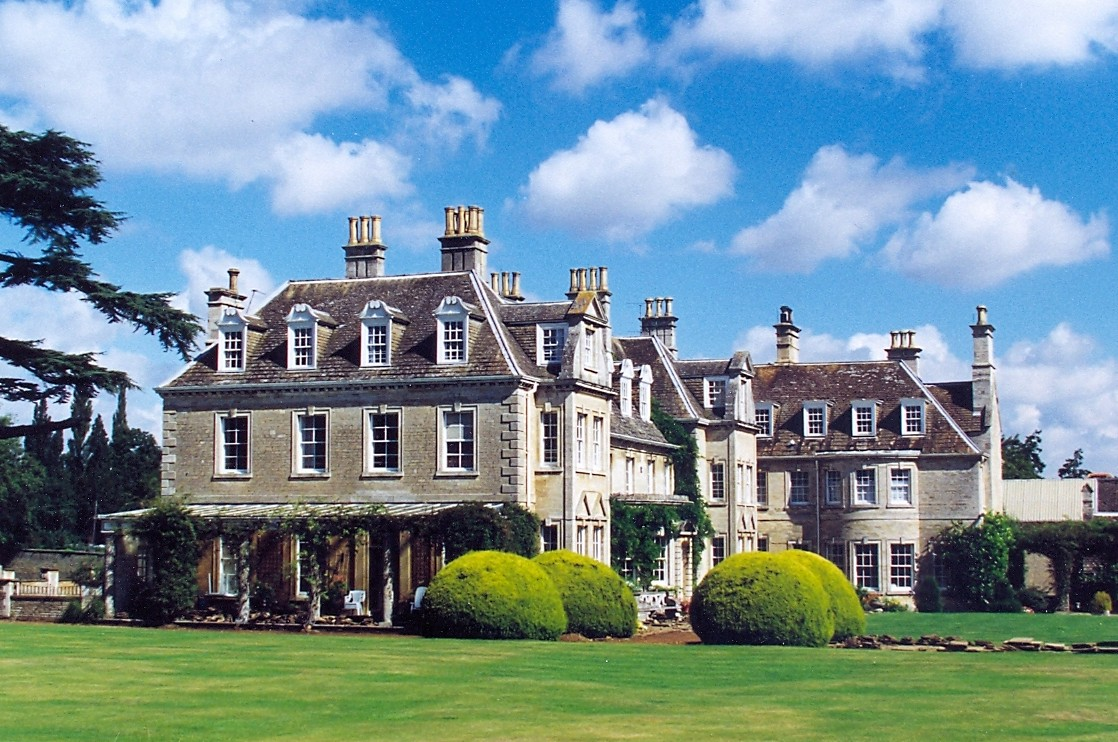
Witham Hall

=== Witham Hall ===
The Rev. Woolsey Johnson (who was a descendant of Robert Johnson, Archdeacon of Leicester, who was the founder of Uppingham School and Oakham School) built the Grade II listed Georgian manor house Witham Hall, which is mentioned by Nikolaus Pevsner in Buildings of England, as a private residence in 1752. Since 1959, it has hosted the coeducational preparatory Witham Hall School.

=== The Parish Church of Saint Andrew ===
The parish church is dedicated to Saint Andrew. Its tower and steeple were rebuilt in a medieval revival style by the Stamford architect George Portwood in 1737–8. The church's graveyard contains the grave of the choral educator James William Webb-Jones and that of his wife Barbara Bindon Moody, who was the granddaughter of Major-General Richard Clement Moody, the founder of British Columbia.

Witham Hall School's historic headmaster Peter Stanley Lyons founded their choir and its tradition of singing from the top of the church's tower on Ascension Day. In 2007, Lyons had a memorial service at the church, which is adjacent to the school whose renown he had built.

Witham Hall School’s founder J. W. E. ('Bill') Banks was buried at the church, where he had a memorial service, after his death in 2005.

=== Other features ===
The original village-stocks and whipping-post are preserved under a newer canopy.

The Six Bells public house was built in 1905 by the architect A. N. Prentice and is Grade II listed. It is on the road to the A6121. When The Six Bells was built, the nearby parish church did have six bells, but in 1932 they were increased to eight.

The nearest state primary school is on Creeton Road in Little Bytham.

In 2002, West Farm (on the Little Bytham road) had trials for GM rapeseed planted by Aventis.

== Geography ==
The village is between the east and west tributaries of the River Glen, and despite its name, is not on the top of its 'hill', which reaches a peak 1 mile (1.6 km) west towards Careby. It is approximately 0.5 miles (0.8 km) from the A6121 Bourne-Stamford road. To the west is Little Bytham, and to the east are Manthorpe and Toft. The predominant landowner in the area is the Grimsthorpe Estate.

The civil parish covers a large area, extending north into Grimsthorpe Park and Dobbins Wood where it meets the boundary of Edenham, and the boundary with Toft with Lound and Manthorpe is mostly along the A6121. Manthorpe, Bourne used to be part of the civil parish.

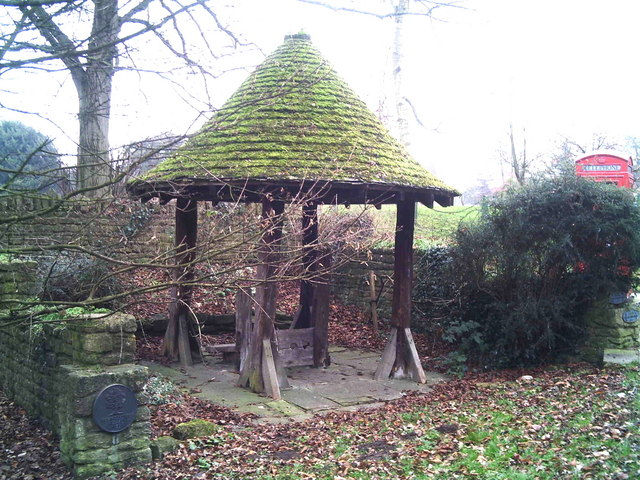
Witham-on-the-Hill stocks
