= Peter le Huray =

English musicologist and choral musician

- Born: 1930
- Died: 7 October 1992 (aged 61–62); Cambridge, England
- Education: St Catharine's College, Cambridge (BA, MA, PhD)
- Occupations: Musicologist; Director of Music
- Known for: Music and the Reformation in England (1967); Musica Britannica Entry for Matthew Locke; Music and Aesthetics in the Eighteenth and Early-Nineteenth Centuries (1981); Recording of the complete works of Franz Liszt
- Spouse: Bridget Payne (m. 1965)

Peter le Huray (1930 – 7 October 1992) was an English musicologist and Director of Music at St Catharine's College, Cambridge, which before his tenure had not been notable for its music.

He was born, to a Guernsey family, in South London in 1930. He received an organ-scholarship to St Catharine's College, Cambridge, which he attended from 1948, and where he received double first-class honours in music and the Barclay Squire Prize. His PhD, on The English Anthem 1580-1640, was supervised by the musicologist Thurston Dart.

His friends included the chorister and choral conductor Peter Stanley Lyons of St John's College, Cambridge, who obtained for him the job of Sunday organist at Vanbrugh Castle School between 1951 and 1954.

He invited keyboardist Gustav Leonhardt and the Kuijken brothers to St. Catharine's to give masterclasses, and acquired for it instruments for historically accurate performances. He served as Director of Music at St Catharine's College, Cambridge, during the 1960s, as which he commissioned the college's extant premier organ, from Cambridge organ-builder William Johnson, which was completed in 1979 and now is in need of repair.

He published the authoritative Music and the Reformation in England in 1967. He specialised in post-Henrican English church-music. Also influential were his Musica Britannica volume, about the anthems and motets of Matthew Locke, and his anthology, Music and Aesthetics in the Eighteenth and Early-Nineteenth Centuries (1981), and his recording of the complete works of Franz Liszt.

He married Bridget Payne in 1965, by whom he had one son and one daughter, and died in Cambridge on 7 October 1992.
