= James Fitzgerald Martin =

British Army Major-General and surgeon

Major-General James Fitzgerald Martin CB CMG CBE KStJ
- Born: 12 June 1876
- Died: 14 February 1958 (aged 81)
- Education: Bath College
- Alma mater: Edinburgh University (MB, ChB, 1899); University of London (DPH, RCS and RCP., 1911)
- Spouse(s): Mary Latimer Hawks Moody (eldest daughter of Colonel Richard S. Hawks Moody and Mary Latimer). Married 05 June 1906 at Exeter Cathedral
- Relatives: Surgeon-Colonel William Thomas Martin (father); Colonel Richard S. Hawks Moody (father-in-law); James William Webb-Jones (brother-in-law); Gerald Dawson Kitchingman, Royal Engineers (son-in-law)
- Military career
- Allegiance: United Kingdom
- Branch: British Army
- Rank: Major-General
- Conflicts: Second Boer War, World War I
- Awards: Knight of Grace of the Order of St. John; Knight of the Order of the Crown of Belgium

Major-General James Fitzgerald Martin CB CMG CBE KStJ (12 June 1876 – 14 February 1958) was a distinguished British Army officer who served as Surgeon to George VI and to the Viceroy of India.

== Family ==
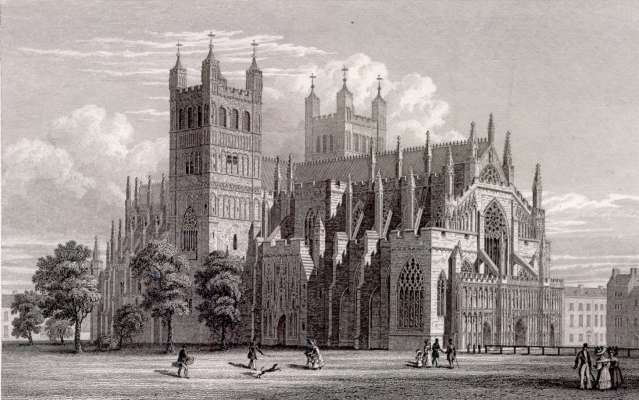
Martin married at Exeter Cathedral

Martin was the only son of Surgeon-Colonel William Thomas Martin (d. 15 September 1923).

His father had served in the Abyssinian War of 1867 to 1868, and was present at the capture of Magdala, was mentioned in dispatches, and received the medal; and in the Burmese War of 1885 to 1887, and received the Indian frontier medal with a clasp.

His father served as surgeon to the Governor of Madras from 1876 to 1877, and at the Royal Victoria Hospital, Netley, and Army Medical School, Netley, from 1880 to 1882.

=== Education ===
Martin was educated at Bath College, and at Edinburgh University (MB, ChB, 1899), and at the University of London (DPH, RCS and RCP, 1911).

=== Marriage and issue ===
He married, at Exeter Cathedral, on 05 June 1906, Mary Latimer Hawks Moody (1883 – 1960), who was the daughter of Colonel Richard S. Hawks Moody and the granddaughter of Major-General Richard Clement Moody who was the founder of British Columbia. Martin had served with his father-in-law in the Second Boer War.

Martin and his wife had one daughter Mary Charlotte (b. 20 September 1909 at The Court, Cullompton, Devon), who married, on 20 September 1929, at Holy Trinity Brompton, Gerald Dawson Kitchingman, of the Royal Engineers, by whom she had one son, Richard Martin Kitchingman (b. 1 March 1933).

== Military career ==
Martin was commissioned into the British Army as a lieutenant on 4 December 1899. He served in the Second Boer War in South Africa from 1900 – 1902, for which he received both the Queen's South Africa Medal, with four clasps, and the King's South Africa Medal, with two clasps. He was promoted to captain on 4 December 1902, and to major in 1911.

He served in World War I between 1914 and 1918, during which he was promoted to lieutenant-colonel in 1917, and was mentioned in despatches five times. He received the CMG, the CBE, and the 1914 Star for his service in World War I. He was promoted to colonel in 1927, and to major-general in 1931. He retired from the British Army in 1935.

== Medical career ==
Martin was employed between 1940 and 1943 by the Ministry of Health as Inspector of Hospitals and Assistant Hospital Officer of No. 3 and No. 6 Regions. He was employed by the Southern Region department of the Ministry of Pensions from 1944 to 1947. Martin served as Honorary Surgeon to King George VI, and to the Viceroy of India.

He was invested as a Knight of Grace of the Order of Saint John of Jerusalem. He was also invested as a Knight of the Order of the Crown of Belgium.
