= All Hallows Preparatory School =

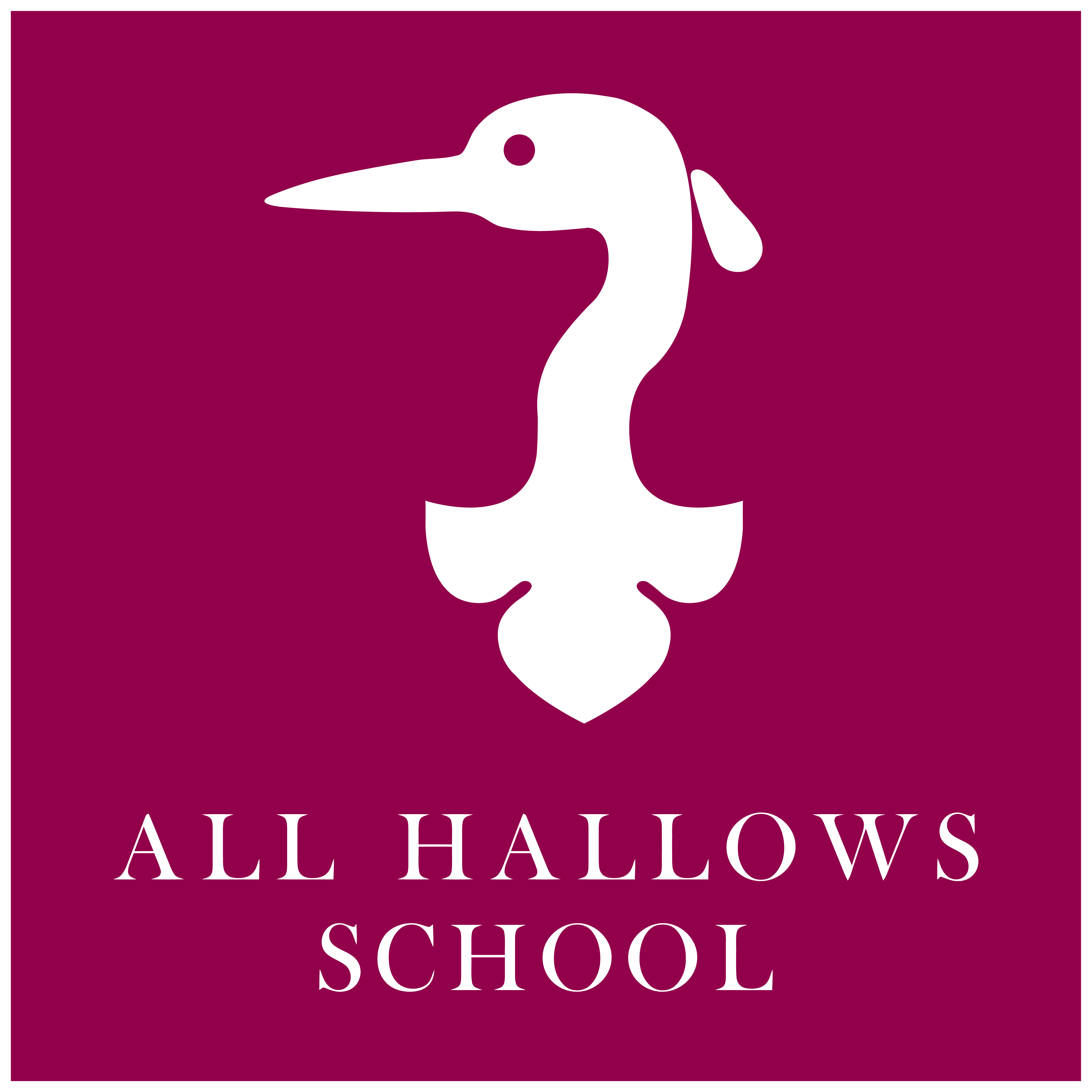

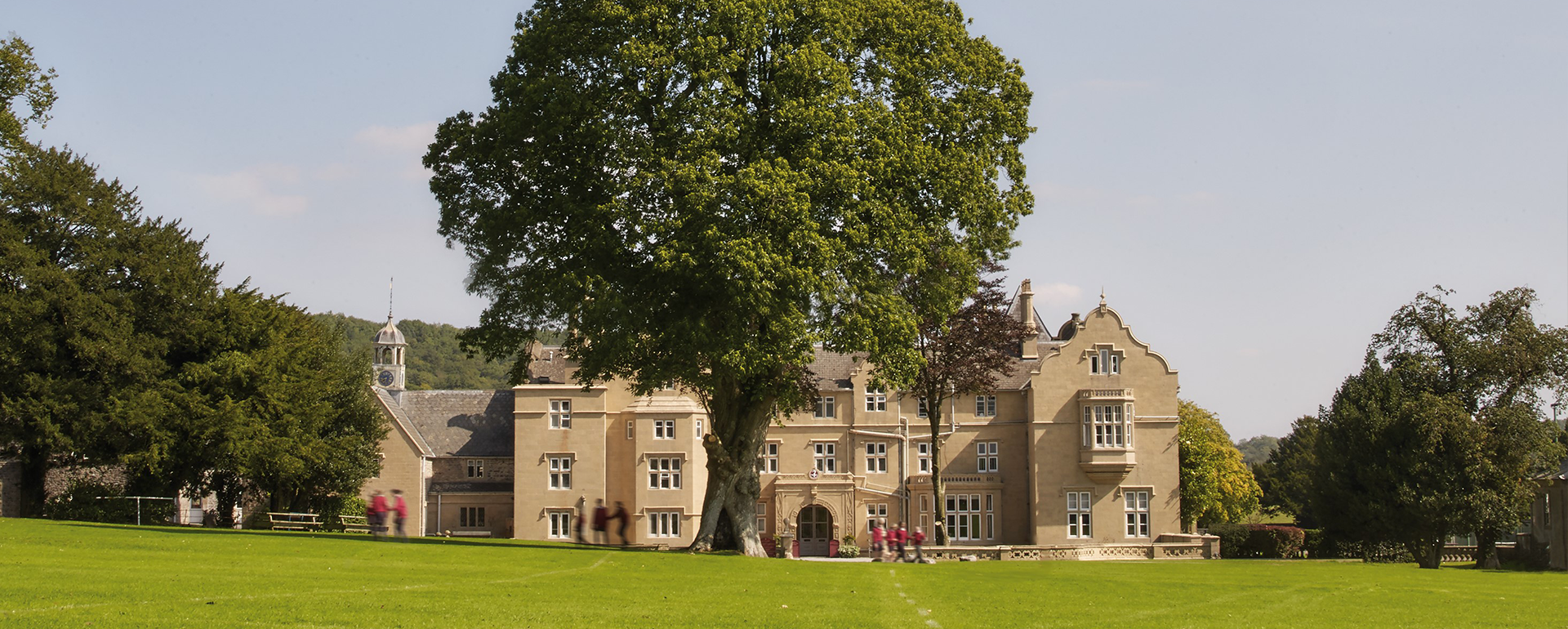
- Cranmore Hall - Home of All Hallows School

Location
- Cranmore Hall; East Cranmore, Somerset, BA4 4SF; England; 51°11′31″N 2°27′25″W

Information
- Type: Preparatory day and boarding
- Motto: Latin: Sancto Cuique Sua Candela (For every saint there is a candle)
- Religious affiliation: Christian
- Established: 1938; 88 years ago
- Head teacher: Trevor Richards
- Gender: Co-educational
- Age: 3 to 13
- Enrolment: ~275
- Colours: Magenta and White
- Publication: The Chronicle
- Website: www.allhallowsschool.co.uk

All Hallows School is a non-selective co-educational prep school that provides day and boarding facilities. A Christian school, it welcomes children of all faiths and none. The school is located a mile east of Cranmore village, near the town of Frome, Somerset, in the West of England. An ISI inspection in July 2014 rated all areas of the school as 'Excellent', the highest possible rating.

== History ==
All Hallows was founded as a boys' school in 1938 by Francis Dix but not at the current location. Shortly after World War II, the school moved into the Grade II* listed Cranmore Hall — the former home of Sir Richard and Lady Muriel Paget — which had been used as a maternity hospital during the war. The choral educator James William Webb-Jones, who had been headmaster of Wells Cathedral School, taught at the school during 1964 and 1965.

The school became co-educational in 1971. In 2006 the school acquired a new modern classroom block, the Crane Wing. The name of Cranmore derives from Crane's Mere — the original name for the area based upon the name of the bird and the former wetlands it inhabited. In 2007 an extension to the reception classroom was built. A Creative Centre was opened in 2014 for Art, Creative Design and Photography.

== Curriculum ==
The school operates a dynamic, child-centred curriculum designed around cross-curricular, thematic termly units of work. Learning links standard academic streams like Mathematics, Science, and English with specialized instruction in Art, Music, Creative Design, and IT. The education framework prioritizes five core attributes known as the "All Hallows Characteristics": curiosity, creativity, resilience, collaboration, and critical thinking.

Outdoor education is explicitly integrated into the schedule utilizing the school's nine-acre woodland and dedicated Forest School. Senior prep students in Years 7 and 8 are prepared for transition to local, national, and international high schools at age 13, progressing via the Independent Schools Examinations Board (ISEB) 13+ Common Entrance Examination or individual senior school scholarship pathways.

== Houses ==
The school has four houses for inter-house competition and fund raising projects. The houses are named after local villages: Batcombe Cranmore Downhead Wanstrow

== Alumni ==
The school has an active community network for former pupils and parents, whose members are colloquially referred to as "cherry jumpers". This alumni group maintains an active community.

As a standalone preparatory feeder school working within the Monkton Family of Schools, a significant percentage of departing Year 8 pupils secure entry, awards, and scholarships to selective secondary destination schools across the UK.

=== Notable alumni ===
- Auberon Waugh, journalist and author
- Ed Horler, England field hockey player
- Arthur Green, England under-20, and Bath Rugby player
