= John Denison (arts administrator) =

John Law Denison (21 January 1911 – 31 December 2006) was a British music administrator, an important figure in British music in the second half of the 20th century.

Denison was educated at St George's School, Windsor, and then at Brighton College and the Royal College of Music. Articled to a solicitor, he played the French horn with amateur groups before joining the BBC Symphony Orchestra in 1934. During World War II he served with the Somerset Light Infantry, and was Mentioned in Dispatches. He became Assistant Director of Music for the British Council in 1946, and joined the Arts Council in 1948. In 1965 he became General Manager of the Royal Festival Hall, and then Director of Music for the whole of London's Southbank Centre. During his tenure he advocated performance of operas in English, and introduced the first London masterclasses.

Although he retired in 1976, his influence on musical life continued through chairmanship of the cultural programme for the Queen's Silver Jubilee in 1977, Honorary Treasurer of the Royal Philharmonic Society from 1977 to 1989, and membership of the Councils of the Royal College of Music and the Musicians' Benevolent Fund.

He was a Fellow of the Royal Society of Arts. In 1989, the Royal Philharmonic Society granted him Honorary Membership, an award which it only rarely bestows.
