= Rex Critchlow =

Architect and industrial designer

Rex Critchlow DA RIBA
- Born: Southampton
- Burial place: St Helen's, Barnoldby le Beck
- Education: Worksop College; Sheffield University
- Occupation: Architect
- Spouse: Jenifer Critchlow (married 1960-2010)
- Children: 2
- Father: William H Critchlow MBE

Rex Critchlow (1936–2010) was a British architect and industrial designer based in Lincolnshire

== Life and career ==
Born in Southampton the third son of William Critchlow, an Esso Oil executive, and Emily (née Leach), Critchlow was educated at Grosvenor House School in Harrogate, Worksop College and the University of Sheffield. After work in London for various practices including Eric Lyons, Critchlow moved to Lincolnshire in 1962 and joined JFPye to form Pye & Partners (subsequently Pye Critchlow Architects) where he practised until 2010. Mickling Barf at Hatcliffe, a house designed by Rex and Jenifer Critchlow for their own occupation was Grade II listed in March 2023. The house was designed and constructed concurrently with Turn End in Haddenham, Buckinghamshire by the architect Peter Aldington (1933-2026) and his wife Margaret as a family home and the couples became friends with both houses showing clear inspiration from the American architect Frank Lloyd Wright (1867-1959) and Finnish architect Alvar Aalto (1898-1976).

== Architectural works ==
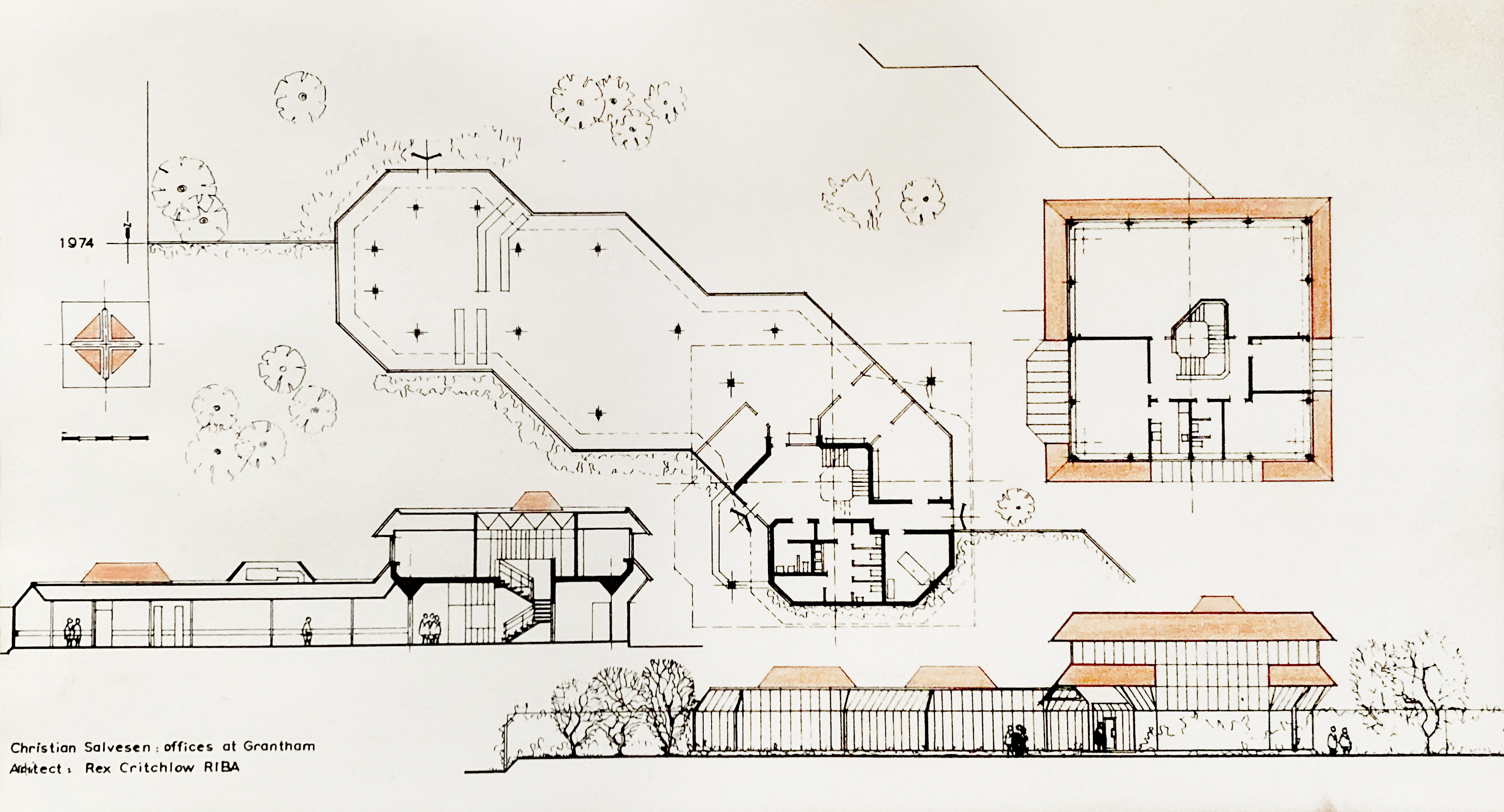
Architects Drawing: New Offices and Canteen for Christian Salvesen, Easton, Lincolnshire 1974

- Offices and Canteen building at Easton, near Grantham for Christian Salvesen (1973–74)
- Witham Hall, Witham-on-the-Hill – stable block conversion to music school
- St Peter's Court, High St, Barton-upon-Humber (1981) – Civic Trust award for infill housing
- Haven Mill, Grimsby – restoration & conversion of 5 storey Victorian mill to shops and restaurant with new footbridge over River Freshney
- Own house Mickling Barf at Barnoldby le Beck (1962–65) was listed Grade II in 2023
- House for Brian Clark, playwright in Derbyshire
- House for author and journalist Philip Oakes & Gilly Hodson at North Owersby

== Industrial design ==
Mold-formed GRP bathroom pod, patented design acquired by Ideal Standard (1971)
