= Julian Harold Legge Lambart =

English educator (1893 - 1982)

- Born: 7 May 1893
- Died: 11 October 1982
- Education: Eton College (King's Scholar 1906 - 1912; Newcastle Scholarship 1910 - 1912)
- Alma mater: King's College, Cambridge (Browne Medal 1913 - 1915)
- Occupation: Educator
- Known for: Lower Master of Eton College (1945 - 1949); Vice-Provost of Eton College (1959 - 1967)
- Spouse(s): Margaret Evans (previously Davies), daughter of The Rev. Canon William Evans
- Military career
- Allegiance: United Kingdom
- Branch: Royal Field Artillery
- Service years: First World War
- Rank: Captain

Julian Harold Legge Lambart (7 May 1893 - 11 October 1982) was a distinguished English educator at Eton College, of which he was Lower Master from 1945 to 1949 and Vice-Provost from 1959 to 1967.

== Family ==
He was born on 7 May 1893. He was the son of Colonel Edgar Alan Lambart CB, and Mary Louisa Walker, who was the daughter of Sir James Robert Walker, 2nd Baronet, and Louisa Susan Marlborough Heron-Maxwell.

His father was the son of Commander The Hon. Oliver William Matthew Lambart and the grandson of Richard Lambart, 7th Earl of Cavan. His father fought in the Second Anglo-Afghan War between 1879 and 1880; and in the Second Boer War between 1901 and 1902; and in the First World War between 1914 and 1917; and was mentioned in despatches, appointed a Companion of the Order of the Bath, and appointed an Honorary Brigadier General.

=== Marriage ===
He married Margaret Evans, a daughter of The Rev. Canon William Evans, who was the Rector of Narberth, Pembrokeshire, on 28 July 1948. Her previous husband had been the composer Sir Henry Walford Davies, who had been Master of the King's Music from 1934 until 1941. His wife was the secretary of the Windsor and Eton Choral Society, of which he was the chairman; and the godmother of Bridget Lyons, who was the daughter of choral educator and headmaster James William Webb-Jones and the wife of choral educator and headmaster Peter Stanley Lyons.

== Education ==
He was educated at Eton College: where he was a King's Scholar, from 1906 to 1912, after attaining second place in the college examination of 1906; and a Newcastle Scholar from 1910 to 1912; and Secretary of the Musical Society, and Captain of the School in 1912. He was then educated at King's College, Cambridge, where he won the Browne Medal for Latin epigram in three consecutive years from 1913 to 1915.

He fought in the First World War, in which he served as an aide-de-camp, was twice mentioned in dispatches, and received the rank of Captain in the Royal Field Artillery and the Croix de Guerre.

== Career ==
At Eton College, he was an Assistant Master from 1919; Housemaster from 1928 to 1946 (of Hawtrey House from 1928 to 1932, and of Godolphin House from 1933 to 1946, after which he moved to Weston's); Lower Master from 1945 and 1949; and Vice-Provost from 1959 to 1967, when he retired. He was succeeded as Vice-Provost by Frederick John Randolph Coleridge.

The Eton College Collections (Archive) retain a portrait of him, and his papers, and a book of his Latin and English verses from his youth.

He died on 11 October 1982. His obituary was published in the Eton College Chronicle of 28 January 1983.
