= St George's School, Windsor Castle =

Independent coeducational preparatory school in Windsor, Berkshire, England

Coordinates: 51.4855°N 0.6056°W

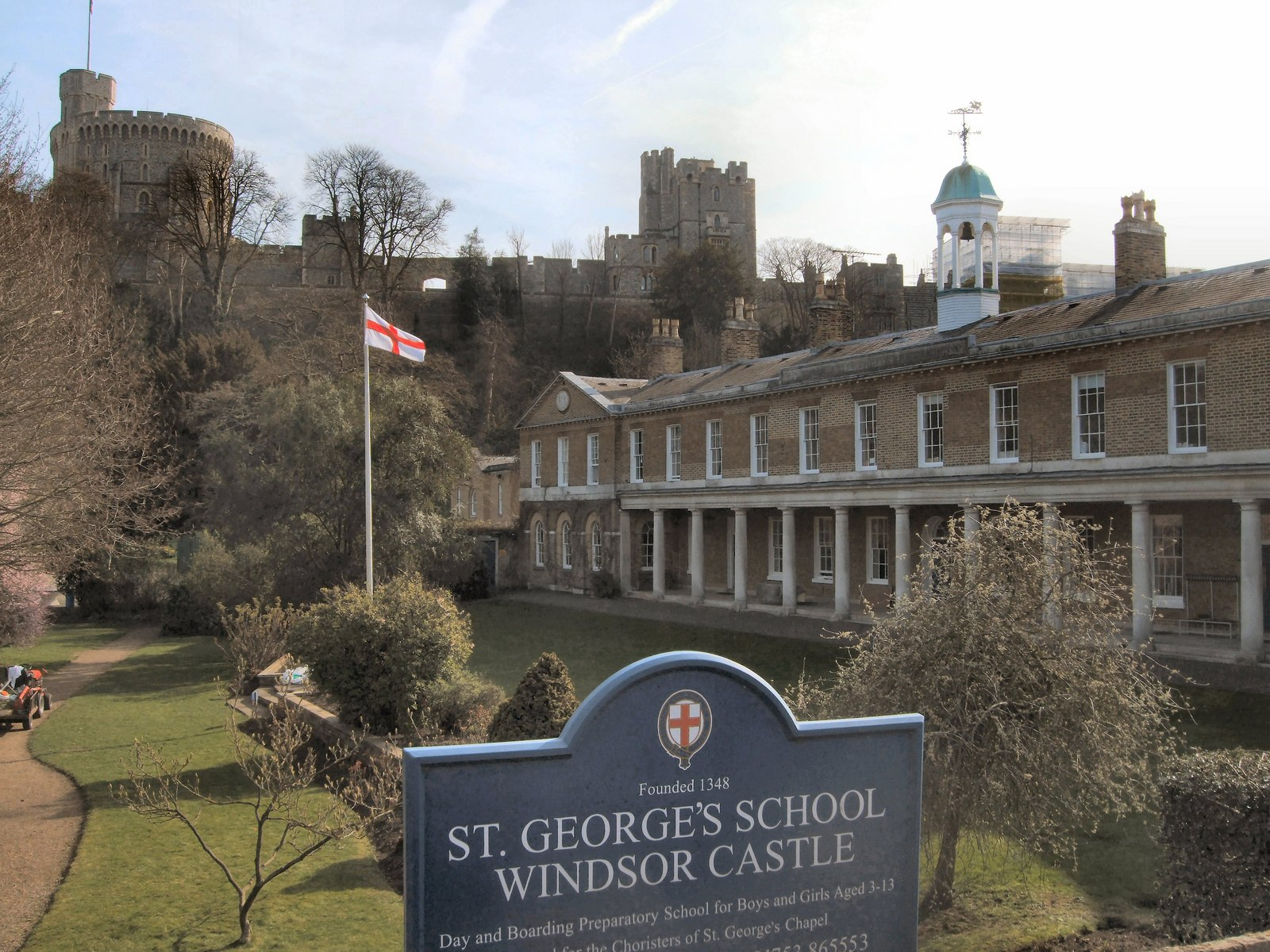
- Windsor Castle; Windsor, Berkshire, SL4 1QF; England

Information
- Type: Private preparatory school Choral foundation school
- Religious affiliation: Church of England
- Established: 1352; 674 years ago
- Founder: Edward III
- Local authority: Windsor and Maidenhead
- Department for Education URN: 110131 Tables
- Chairman of the Governors: Christopher Cocksworth, Dean of Windsor
- Headmaster: Emma Károlyi
- Staff: 80 (approx.)
- Gender: Coeducational
- Age: 3 to 13
- Enrolment: 410 (approx.)
- Houses: Garter, Clarence, Lancaster, Winchester
- Website: www.stgwindsor.org

Listed Building – Grade II*
- Official name: St George's School
- Designated: 4 January 1975
- Reference no.: 1319325

St George's School, Windsor Castle is a coeducational independent preparatory school in Windsor, Berkshire, England. It was founded to provide choirboys for the Choir of St George's Chapel. It now educates over 400 boys and girls.

== History ==
The school was established to provide six choristers for the Choir of St George's Chapel, Windsor Castle, which is the official country residence of the British royal family. St George's is one of the oldest schools in the country, and has provided an unbroken line of boy choristers to sing daily services in St George's Chapel since 1352.

In 1942, the school was described by its headmaster as being "for the sons of Gentlemen only".

The school's choristers have sung at events such as the wedding of Prince Edward and Sophie Rhys-Jones, now the Duchess of Edinburgh; the funeral of John Hunt, Baron Hunt; and also the blessing of the wedding of the now King Charles III and Queen Camilla.

== Present day ==
The 17 full choristers live at the school, with about seven 'probationers' who are mostly day pupils. The choristers attend lessons at the school with the other children and rehearse each day before and after school in the Song School by the Chapel, where they also sing seven services each week during term time. Their school fees are partly met by grants from the Dean and Canons of Windsor.

The school has a boarding community of 30 children, many of whom board on weekly or flexible arrangements. Most pupils have experienced some level of boarding before they leave at 13.

The school buildings are situated just below the north wall of Windsor Castle, with the school being divided into three distinct sections – the Pre-Prep (Nursery to Year 2) the Middle School (Years 3, 4 and 5) and the Senior School (Years 6, 7 and 8).

Nearly all pupils over the age of 7 learn an instrument, the majority of girls take part in ballet, tap or jazz dancing and a range of school choirs covers all age-groups.

Although the school is a town centre school, spacious playing fields are situated next door to the school site, within the King's private grounds. Boys play football, rugby and cricket and the girls play netball, hockey and rounders. Swimming takes place in the school's indoor pool.

In 2021, the house names were changed from Revenge, Rodney, Vindictive and Victory, to Garter, Clarence, Lancaster and Winchester. They are now named after the towers at Windsor Castle. The original houses were named after warships.

At the beginning of the 2024/25 school year, St George's welcomed their first ever female head teacher, Emma Károlyi.

== Headmasters ==
- 1893–95: A. Bickerseth
- 1885–1904: Herman Frederick William Deane
- 1904–34: George Starr Fowler
- 1934–42: James William Webb-Jones
- 1942–45: Philip Herbert Cyril Cavenaugh (acting headmaster)
- 1946–71: William Paul Oke Cleave
- 1971–83: Richard Russell
- 1983–92: George Hill
- 1992–93: Bernard Biggs
- 1993: Anthony Brailsford (acting headmaster)
- 1993–95: Alan Mould
- 1995–99: Roger Marsh
- 1999: Alan Mould (interregnum; autumn term)
- 2000–11: Roger Jones
- 2011–12: Andrew Salmond-Smith
- 2012–17: Chris McDade
- 2017–18: Roger Jones
- 2019–24: William Goldsmith
- 2024–present : Emma Károlyi

== Notable pupils ==
- Princess Eugenie of York (born 1990), daughter of The Duke of York and granddaughter of Queen Elizabeth II
- Lady Louise Mountbatten-Windsor (born 2003), daughter of Prince Edward, Duke of Edinburgh and granddaughter of Queen Elizabeth II
- Timothy Bavin (born 1935), Anglican bishop
- Michael Chance (born 1955), countertenor
- John Denison (1911–2006), music administrator
- David Fanshawe (1942–2010), classical composer
- John David Morley (born 1948), writer and novelist
- Francis Grier (born 1955), classical composer
- Miles Jupp (born 1979), comedian
- John Lubbock, conductor

== See also ==
- Grade II* listed buildings in Berkshire
- List of the oldest schools in the United Kingdom
- List of the oldest schools in the world
- St George's Chapel at Windsor Castle
