= John Brownlie (hymnist) =

British hymnist

Rev. John Brownlie D.D. (3 August 1857 - 18 November 1925) was a Scottish hymnodist best known for his translations of early Greek and Latin hymns into English. He was born in Glasgow, Scotland. He received his higher education at the University of Glasgow and the Free Church College. He was licensed by the Presbytery of Glasgow in 1884. In 1885 became assistant minister of Trinity Free Church in Portpatrick, Wigtownshire, Scotland and succeeded the senior pastor there upon his death in 1890. He became a governor of Stranraer High School in 1897, and chairman of the governors in 1901. Glasgow University awarded him an honorary D.D. degree in 1908 for his work in hymnology. He died in Crieff, Perthshire, Scotland and was buried in Portpatrick.
