= Royal Masonic School for Boys =

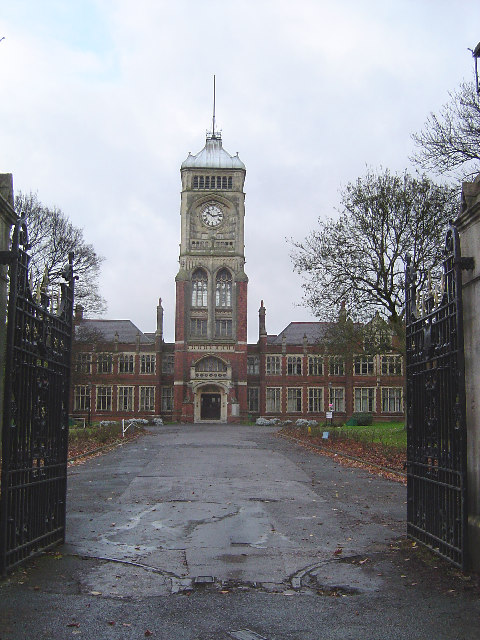
- Former Royal Masonic School for Boys, Bushey

Location
- Bushey; Hertfordshire; England; 51.6522°N 0.3702°W

Information
- Type: Private school
- Established: 1903
- Closed: 1977
- Local authority: Hertfordshire County Council
- Gender: Boys
- Age range: 4–18
- Website: https://www.oldmasonians.org

The Royal Masonic School for Boys was an English private school for boys at Bushey in Hertfordshire.

== History ==
The origins of the school lie in the charities established in the late 18th century to clothe and educate the sons of Freemasons near their homes. These charities amalgamated in 1852 and established a boys' school at Wood Green in North London in 1857. The foundation stone for a new school in Bushey was laid by the Duke of Connaught and Strathearn. It was designed by Gordon & Gunton and completed in 1903. A Junior School was added on the other side of The Avenue in 1929 and by 1939 there were 800 boys at the school.

Following a decline in pupil numbers the junior school closed in 1970, with the senior school closing in 1977. The site of the junior school is now occupied by The Grange Academy. The Royal Masonic School for Girls, based at Rickmansworth, Hertfordshire, was unaffected by the closure.

The site was acquired by Comer Homes in 1998; the buildings were rented out to the United States International University (Europe) (later Alliant International University) until 2009 when Comer Homes began redeveloping the site as Royal Connaught Park.

== Notable alumni ==
- Anthony Andrews – Actor
- Percy Jack Clayson – First World War Fighter Ace
- David Davies (football administrator) – The Football Association Director, Broadcaster and Author
- Richard Evans – Businessman
- Robin Gibson – Art Historian
- Gavin Hamilton (British Army officer) – Military Cross (Posthumously Awarded)
- Sir Stuart Hampson – chairman, John Lewis Partnership
- Richard Holme – British Liberal Democrat Politician
- Air Vice-Marshal Frederick Charles Hurrell – Director-General Of The RAF Medical Services From 1986 to 1988
- Richard Lewis – Dean of Wells From 1990 To 2003
- Paul Pickering – Writer
- Charles Phillips - Archaeologist in charge of the excavation of Sutton Hoo burial ship.
- Harvey Postlethwaite – Formula One Designer
- Brent Sadler – CNN News Reporter in the Middle East
- Harry Leonard Shorto – British linguist
- D. R. Thorpe – Political Biographer
- Ernest Warburton – Musicologist
- Simon Warr - BBC radio broadcaster, television personality, writer and former teacher.
- Brian Wenham – Television and Radio Administration

== In popular culture ==
From the 1950s until recently, the senior and junior school were used for films, including It's Great to Be Young (1956), Lucky Jim (1957), Monty Python's The Meaning of Life (1983), and Indiana Jones and the Last Crusade (1989). The opening scenes of the 1960s children's series Thunderbirds were filmed in the old science block. The senior school and its grounds were used throughout the long-running 2000s series Judge John Deed, starring Martin Shaw, employing the teaching block as the judges's chambers and other parts of the senior school for the in-court scenes. The interior was used for the 1990 comedy Nuns on the Run. The school's dining hall was used as the Great Hall for the Harry Potter films.
