= Lionel McColvin =

British librarian (b. 1896, d. 1976)

Lionel McColvin CBE
- Born: 30 November 1896; Heaton, Newcastle upon Tyne, United Kingdom
- Died: 16 January 1976 (aged 79)
- Occupation: Librarian
- Writing career
- Notable works: The Public Library System of Great Britain; The Chance to Read; Music Libraries; How to Find Out

Lionel Roy McColvin CBE (1896–1976), commonly referred to as Lionel McColvin, was a British librarian. He has been described as "the dominant figure in British public librarianship" in the mid-20th century and a "world leader" in the profession of librarianship. Through his membership of the Library Association and several international library committees he worked constantly to improve the "status of librarianship" and its "standards of service".

== Early life and career ==
Lionel McColvin was born at Heaton, Newcastle upon Tyne on 30 November 1896. His parents were Andrew McColvin, a portrait painter, and his wife, Isabel (née Stewart).

After his family moved to London in 1901, he attended the Portland Road Primary School, South Norwood and, after winning a scholarship, the Croydon Council Boys' Secondary School.

In 1911 he became a junior assistant at the Croydon Public Libraries, in the Central Library, Katharine Street, Croydon, working successively under the Principal Librarians Stanley Jast and W. C. Berwick Sayers. Under Jast and Berwick Sayers, that library exhibited many "new ideas and developments" in such areas as "open access, cataloguing, subject cataloguing, extension activities, and work with children" and was a good training ground for McColvin.

During the First World War he enlisted in the 24th Middlesex Regiment and then transferred to the 2nd Border Regiment. He fought in the Third Battle of Ypres.

After the war he returned to the Croydon Public Libraries and in 1921 was appointed as chief assistant, "with chief responsibility for reference services", at Wigan Public Library. Wigan's reference library was "closed access" when he arrived but was later "opened up with a commercial and information section".

He studied at the school of librarianship at University College, University of London, successfully taking the Library Association examinations and defending a thesis with the title Music in Public Libraries (which would be published by Grafton & Co. in 1924), resulting in his gaining a Library Association Diploma.

== Ipswich ==
Appointed as Chief Librarian in Ipswich, Suffolk in 1924, he was involved in planning the interior of the new central library there and making much of it open access, restocking the book shelves, creating a children's collection, promoting musicals, drama and other extension activities, and actively publicising the library service. In those efforts he was supported by the generosity of Bill Paul, the head of the local firm of corn merchants, R. & W. Paul Ltd.

During his years in Wigan and Ipswich McColvin began his long writing career, with books published including The Theory of Book Selection for Public Libraries (1927) and Library Extension Work and Publicity (1925).

== Hampstead ==
In 1931 McColvin was made Borough Librarian at Hampstead in North London and the curator of the Keats House Museum. He was a central figure in the launch of the new Belsize Branch Library that was opened in a Modern Movement building in 1937. The reference stock at Hampstead was "excellent" but its lending stock "left much to be desired". For that reason he refreshed the lending book stock.

He continued his predecessor's series of "extensive lecture programmes" and introduced a programme of chamber music concerts. He published a number of "influential" books on topics including public libraries and music librarianship.

== Westminster ==
In 1938 McColvin was appointed as Librarian of the City of Westminster in central London, a position he held until his retirement in 1961.

When the Second World War broke out, he spent much time on civil defense duties and was appointed Officer-in-Charge of the City Hall Report Centre in Westminster.

After the war he opened a branch library, known as the Central Lending Library, at Charing Cross Road and was one of a group that in 1948 set up the Gramophone Record Library (sometimes referred to as the Central Music Library and now known as the Westminster Music Library), which incorporated the private library of the late music critic Edwin Evans. Both the Central Lending Library and the Gramophone Record Library were extremely popular, with 700,000 books being lent per year. Meanwhile the Central Reference Library was relocated to St. Martin's Lane, in the City of Westminster.

In 1941 McColvin was appointed by The Library Association to undertake an exhaustive survey of the libraries of Great Britain. He was instructed to inquire into the immediate wartime problems being experienced by libraries and into possible postwar developments. After a tour of all the libraries up and down the country, he submitted his report on 9 September 1942. In it he analysed the "finance, staff and ... organisation" of each library and gave a "detailed blue-print" of a proposed new library service in the years to come with suggested improvements in many fields of librarianship.

This report was published as The Public Library System of Great Britain: Its Post-war Reorganization and Development. Often dubbed the McColvin Report, its advocacy of its modern goals, including careful planning, benchmarking and budgeting, and improved library standards and service, along with a higher professional status for librarians and better library education, was, however, countered by "parochialism" and "conservatism" among British librarians which were only defeated after thirty years of debate and with changes in local government in the 1960s and 1970s.

From July 1945, as evacuated stock and archives returned to Westminster, McColvin established a children's section in Drury Lane and the Westminster History Collection of "archives, books, prints, maps and other materials". In 1946 he opened another children's library in Regent Street and in 1947 he launched a Service for Old People.

During the 1950s he rehoused the Council's archives and created a separate Children's Library Department, he consolidated book stocks and acquired a number of special collections (for example, the Pavlova Memorial Library), encouraged the "deposit of parish and other records", and built the Churchill Gardens Children's Library which opened in 1960.

He published further books, including The Personal Library (1953), The Chance to Read (1956) and Public Library Services for Children (1957).

== Library Association ==
McColvin was active in the United Kingdom's Library Association, being a member of its Council (1925-61) and serving as its Honorary Secretary (1954-51), its President (from 1951) and finally an Honorary Fellow (from 1961). He also edited the Association's journal, the Library Association Journal, for several years.

He urged the Council of The Library Association to "take continuous and positive action" to secure the professional position of librarians and he was the founder, chairman and first president of the Society of Municipal and County Chief Librarians, which was the first trade union for Chief Librarians.

== International librarianship ==
In 1936 he was commissioned by the Library Association to visit the United States for three months and conduct a survey of public libraries there, the results of which were published in 1938 as A Survey of Libraries. In 1946-47 he made a similar investigative tour of libraries in Australia, New Zealand, Singapore, the Middle East and the U.S. and in the 1950s similar tours in various parts of Europe. All of those tours resulted in recommendations for improvements in the library practice.

He was a champion of the British Council and in particular the functions of its overseas libraries of fostering understanding and closer ties between the British people and people in other lands. He was a close friend and ally of Sir Ronald Forbes Adam, the Council's Director General from 1946 to 1954.

He was vice-president and chairman of the public libraries section of the International Federation of Library Associations (IFLA), a member of the International Federation for Information (also known by its original French name, the Fédération internationale de documentation, or FID), and a member of the British co-operating committee of UNESCO.

== Besterman/McColvin Medals ==
The Library Association's and now the Chartered Institute of Library and Information Professionals (CILIP)'s ISG (Information Services Group) Besterman/McColvin Awards (often referred to as the Besterman/McColvin Medals) which originally were "for outstanding works of reference" and now are for "outstanding works of electronic resources and e-books", were named for both men.

== Legacy ==
McColvin was an idealistic "visionary" who worked for the development, reconstruction and modernisation of libraries, particularly public libraries, during the rise of the welfare state in 20th century Britain and the social and economic recovery from the Second World War. He emphasised the national importance of libraries and also their contribution in the international sphere to building a "better postwar world".

== Personal life ==
In 1922 McColvin married Mary Carter, whom he met in Wigan. She was the eldest child and only daughter of William and Esther Carter. They had four children together: Roy (born 1923), Malcolm (born 1925), Margaret (born 1927) and Janet (born 1943).

After being forced to retire in 1961 following two strokes, McColvin died on 16 January 1976 at Southgate, a suburban area of north London.

== Honours ==
- C.B.E. - awarded in 1951 New Year Honours

== Bibliography ==
=== Books ===
- The Theory of Book Selection for Public Libraries, London: Grafton & Co., 1925.
- Euterpe, or the Future of Art, London: Kegan Paul, Trench, Trübner & Co., 1926 (To-day and To-morrow series).
- How to Use Books, London: Cambridge University Press for the National Book League, 1933; 2nd edition: 1947; first paperback edition: 2016.
- Library Stock and Assistance to Readers: A Textbook, London: Grafton & Co., 1936.
- Libraries and the Public, London: George Allen & Unwin Ltd., 1937.
- Music Libraries: Their Organisation and Contents, with a Bibliography of Music and Musical Literature (2 vols.), London: Grafton & Co., 1937–8; revised and expanded edition (Jack Dove, ed.): London: Andre Deutsch, 1965 (2 vols.).
- The Public Library System of Great Britain: Its Post-war Reorganization and Development, London: The Library Association, 1942-43. Often referred to as the "McColvin Report".
- How to Find Out, London: Cambridge University Press for the National Book League, 1947.
- British Libraries, London: Longmans, Green for The British Council, 1949. Joint author: James Revie.
- Public Library Extension, Paris: UNESCO, 1949.
- The Personal Library: A Guide for the Bookbuyer, London: Phoenix House, Ltd., 1953.
- The Chance to Read: Public Libraries in the World Today, London: Phoenix House, 1956.
- Public Library Services for Children, Paris: UNESCO, 1957.

=== Articles, papers ===
- "Public Libraries and Other Libraries", Libri, Volume 6: No. 4, 1956, pp. 304-321.

== See also ==
- Edward Edwards
