= 4 Hamilton Place =

Coordinates: 51.5044°N 0.1504°W

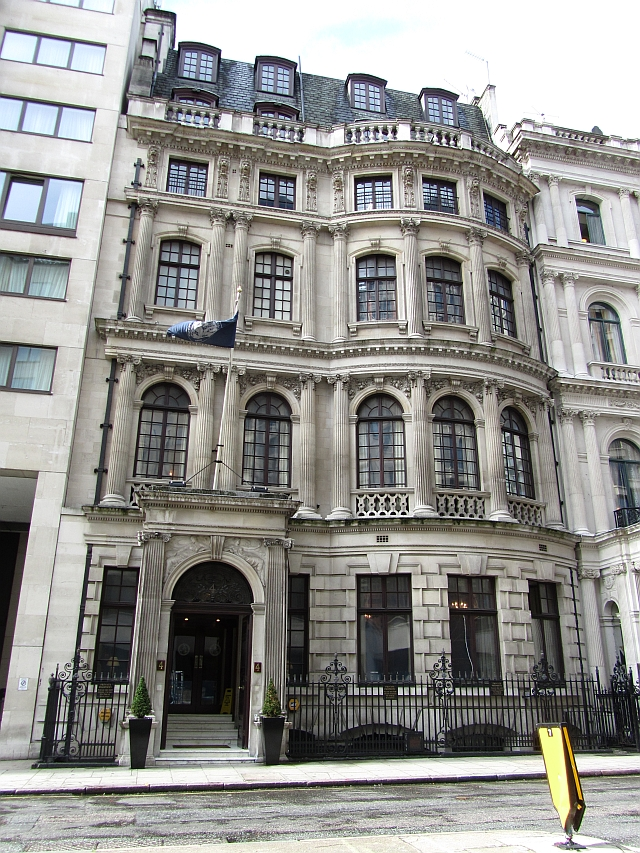
- Interactive map of the 4 Hamilton Place area

General information
- Type: Conference centre and wedding venue
- Location: Mayfair, 4 Hamilton Place, London, United Kingdom
- Current tenants: The Royal Aeronautical Society
- Completed: 17th century

Design and construction
- Architect: A.N. Prentice

4 Hamilton Place is a Grade-II-listed building in Mayfair, London. It is used as a conference centre and wedding venue, located on the north-east edge of Hyde Park Corner, with the nearest access being Hyde Park Corner Underground station. Since 1939 it has been the headquarters of the Royal Aeronautical Society. The venue is also part of the Westminster Collection, a selection of Westminster's finest venues.

== History ==
The first reference to the short street now known as Hamilton Place appears in the latter half of the 17th century. On the restoration of the monarchy in 1660, Charles II granted James Hamilton, a ranger of Hyde Park and later groom of the bedchamber, a corner of land which had been excluded from Hyde Park when it was walled. A street bearing Hamilton's name (which eventually became Hamilton Place) was constructed from Piccadilly to the park wall but the houses on it were small with none of the elegance which later came to be associated with the area.

Towards the end of the 18th century, by which time Hamilton's lease had been acquired by others, the houses in Hamilton Street were said to be "in a ruinous condition and intended to be removed". They were replaced by a row of houses with a view over the park. Plans were then produced to build three new houses on Piccadilly to make a symmetrical group. Those surviving (141–144 Piccadilly) were demolished in the early 1970s, at the same time as 2–3 Hamilton place, to build the hotel InterContinental.

The architect Thomas Leverton (who also planned some of Bedford Square) was mentioned as a surveyor to the Hamilton Place scheme and he is referred to as the builder "acting on his own plans." Documentary evidence shows that Leverton designed 4 Hamilton Place in 1807 for his client, the 2nd Earl of Lucan, who took up the lease in 1810.

A later resident was the Duke of Wellington, who rented the property in 1814 before moving to Apsley House. Later Lord Granville became the tenant in 1822.

Until the end of the 19th century, the house was occupied by a succession of bankers, the last of whom was the then Viceroy of India, Lord Northbrook, previously Thomas George Baring. Lord Northbrook owned many paintings by notable artists that he housed in the Baring Gallery at No. 4 Hamilton Place.

The last private owner of 4 Hamilton Place was Mr Leopold Albu (1861–1938). Born on 10 March 1861, he was the son of Simon Albu and Fanny Sternberg, a German Jewish family originally based at Brandenburg. In 1876 Leopold and his elder brother George – later Sir George Albu (1857–1935) – emigrated to South Africa where they became one of South Africa's original "Randlord" dynasties. After some time in Cape Town, they moved to the diamond-fields of Kimberley, accumulated financial interests, and sold out to De Beers at a substantial profit. George Albu subsequently purchased the ailing Meyer and Charlton Mine, restructured it and, on 30 December 1895, he and his brother Leopold established General Mining and Finance Corporation — changing the name of their firm from G&L Albu — one of the original companies that led to the Gencor consortium that survives. Leopold Albu married Adelaide Veronica Elizabeth Burton, daughter of Edgar Henry Burton, on 19 August 1901, at St George's, Hanover Square, as by this time Albu was a well-known millionaire. However, the marriage ended acrimoniously — news of the divorce petition even being reported on in The New York Times on 9 February 1915.

== Royal Aeronautical Society Headquarters ==
In 1903, Leopold Albu, managing director of the General Mining and Finance Corporation and chairman of the Phoenix Oil and Transport Company, was granted a new 63-year lease on the property on condition that he spent at least £20,000 on improvements.

Instead he chose to rebuild altogether, erecting on the site a new house at a cost exceeding £50,000. His architect was A. N. Prentice and the work was completed in 1907. The design closely followed that of the adjacent house. All the rooms were decorated in the Louis XVI style associated with the Ritz Hotel of 1906. Much of this survives intact though, as was fashionable in the 1930s, some of the gilding visible in the drawing room which became the Argyll Room was overpainted with cream, of which much remains.

Following Mr Albu's death on 19 March 1938 aged 77, a series of auction sales at Christie's and elsewhere appear to have been held in which the paintings, furnishings etc. of his house at 4 Hamilton Place were sold.

In March 1939 the Royal Aeronautical Society moved into No. 4 Hamilton Place. Some minor alterations were required but these were kept to a minimum. Mr Albu's dining room on the ground floor became the society's Council Room. During the Second World War staff remained on the premises, but many archives and records were removed to safety. The house suffered blast damage on seven occasions.

In 1957 the reconstruction of Hyde Park Corner and the chance to purchase land from No. 5 gave the opportunity to build on the No. 4 Hamilton Place's garden, which, until then had adjoined the park so that access problems would have been almost insuperable. The remainder of properties on the street aside from these two were demolished.

A successful appeal by the president of the Royal Aeronautical Society, Sir Arnold Hall, raised most of the money for a lecture theatre, which was opened in December 1960. At the same time the opportunity was taken to add a fifth floor to the top of the house to provide additional office space. Alterations were made to the fourth floor, which had been servants' bedrooms in Mr Albu's time, to provide a housekeeper's flat and better office accommodation, and the lease was extended to 2004. This was subsequently extended to 2059. During 2003 the lecture theatre was refurbished and re-equipped following a donation from the Boeing Company and officially reopened as the Bill Boeing Lecture Theatre by Phil Condit, then chairman and CEO of the Boeing Company, on 10 November 2003. In 1987 the library was removed from the first floor to the third, and Mr Albu's magnificent drawing room is now used for formal dinners, buffet parties and other similar functions. It is known as the Argyll Room in honour of the society's first president, the Duke of Argyll. In the following years other rooms were named, mainly after British aviation pioneers.

During 2006 the basement area under the lecture theatre, which for many years had been used as an overflow book and journal store for the library, was cleared and completely refurbished following generous sponsorship by Airbus UK, to create the Airbus Business Suite consisting of three meeting rooms and a members' area with computer access and flat-screen TV. This was officially opened by Iain Gray, then managing director of Airbus UK, on 18 July. In 2008, a final basement storeroom within the Airbus Business Suite was converted into the de Havilland Room.

On 31 March 2009 the Royal Aeronautical Society completed the purchase of the freehold of No. 4 Hamilton Place from the Crown Estate, thereby safeguarding its headquarters for future generations of aeronautical engineers.

== In popular culture ==
No. 4 Hamilton Place was used as the Embassy Club in the Christmas special 2013, of ITV's series Downton Abbey.

As part of the Commonwealth Heads of Government Meeting in 2018, Prince Harry and Meghan Markle attended a Women's Empowerment reception, hosted by Foreign Secretary Boris Johnson, at 4 Hamilton Place.
