= Westminster Music Library =

Public specialist music library in Westminster

The Westminster Music Library in the City of Westminster is one of the largest public music libraries in the UK. It includes sheet music, scores, sets of parts for performances, press cuttings and books about music. Since 2021 the collection has been housed within the Westminster Reference Library in St Martin's Street, part of the Westminster Libraries network. For more than 70 years it was located within Victoria Library at 160, Buckingham Palace Road on the first floor.

A private library, the Central Music Library Limited (CML), was first established in 1947, formed to keep together the personal library of the late music critic Edwin Evans and his father. Initial funding for this came from a £10,000 endowment by the pianist and composer Winifred Christie as a memorial to her late husband, the Hungarian composer Emánuel Moór. CML was then invited to deposit its collection within Westminster Public Libraries, and was renamed as the Westminster Central Music Library, which opened in October 1948. Librarian Lionel McColvin, appointed as Librarian of the City of Westminster in 1938, was involved in the establishment of the collection. The American librarian Dorothy Lawton also advised on the initial organization. Another critic, Harold Rutland, bequeathed his extensive collection to the library after his death in July 1977.

Today there are over 30,000 music scores and performance parts, a large collection of vocal sets, sheet music, and 17,000 books about music for reference and loan. The library holds every edition of Grove's Dictionary and an archive of 450 music journal titles. The library is particularly noted for its coverage of British scores from the 19th and early 20th century, and for its collection of press cuttings, originally the working library of Edwin Evans.
