= A. N. Prentice =

British architect (1866–1941)

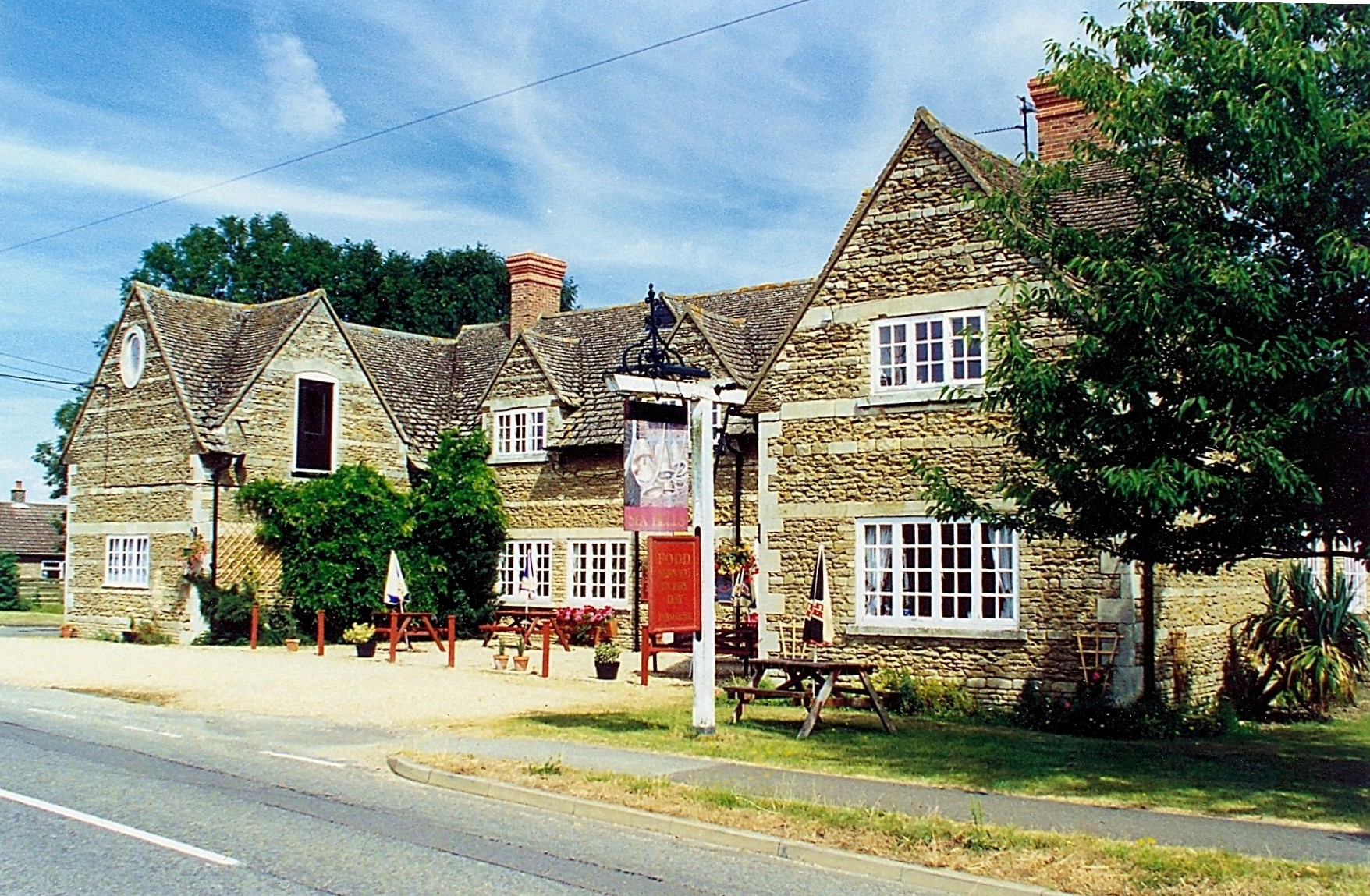
The Six Bells at Witham on the Hill, 1905

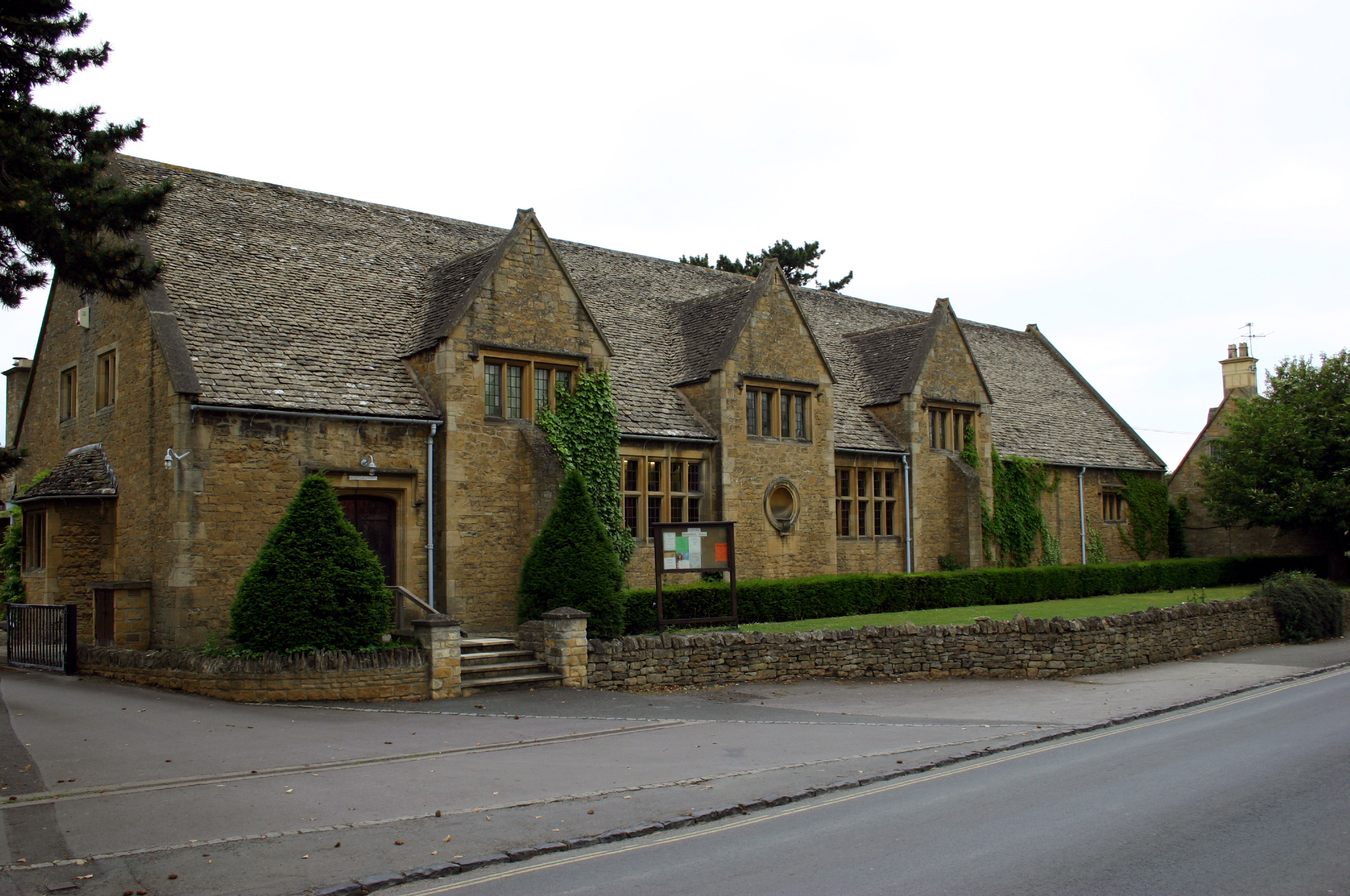
Lifford Memorial Hall, Broadway 1915

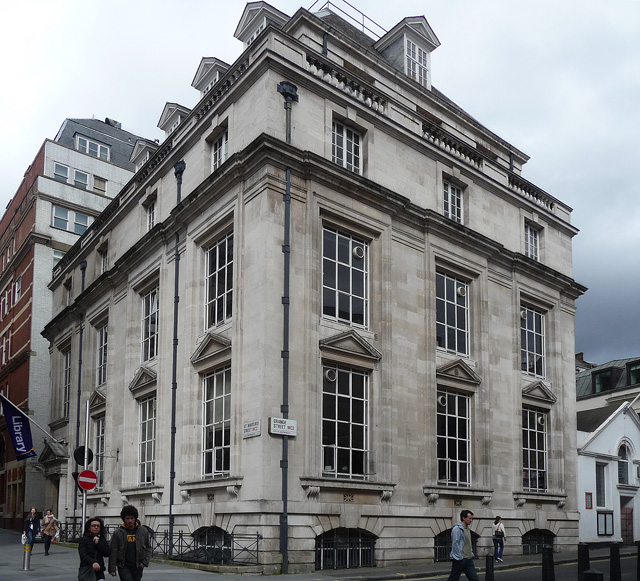
Westminster Reference Library 1926-28

Andrew Noble Prentice FRIBA (20 April 1866 – 23 December 1941) was a British architect.

== Family ==
Noble was born on 20 April 1866 in Greenock, the son of Thomas Prentice (1830–1908) and Jessie Mcalpine (b. 1829). He died on 23 December 1941 in Llandudno and left and estate valued at £43,960 (equivalent to £2,749,800 in 2023). Of this, £6,000 was left to the Royal Institute of British Architects to provide travelling associatedships or studentships to Spain and also for books for the library of the Institute.

== Career ==
Noble was educated at Glasgow University and then articled to William Leiper of Glasgow from 1883. In 1888 he won the Soane Medallion Travelling Studentship by the Royal Institute of British Architects for a design for a gentleman's residence. From 1890 to 1892 he was assistant to Thomas Edward Collcutt in London. In 1891 he was awarded second prize in the Owen Jones competition of the Royal Institute of British Architects for a selection of sketches in watercolour and pencil from a recent visit to Spain and Italy.

In 1893 Noble started in independent practice. He entered into partnerships, with William Mackereth Dean from 1920 to 1933, and with H.J. Scaping and Arthur Henry Wheatley from 1935 to 1940. His designs include:

- The East Range of Witham Hall, which is a Grade II listed building, which was built between 1903 and 1905;
- The Six Bells Public House, Main Street, Witham on the Hill, Lincolnshire. 1905 Grade II listed
- 4 Hamilton Place, Mayfair, London, which was built in 1907.
- St Andrew's Church, Witham on the Hill 1907-08 (restoration)
- Stenigot House, Stenigot, a Neo-Georgian house, which was built in 1911, and its stables, which were built in 1913;
- Lifford Memorial Hall, Station Road, Broadway, Worcestershire 1915 Grade II listed
- Westminster Reference Library, a Grade II listed building, which was built between 1926 and 1928;

== Selected publications ==
- Renaissance architecture and ornament in Spain: A series of examples selected from the purest works executed between the years 1500-1560, measured and drawn, together with short descriptive text.
