= City of Westminster =

City and borough in London, England

- London borough and city
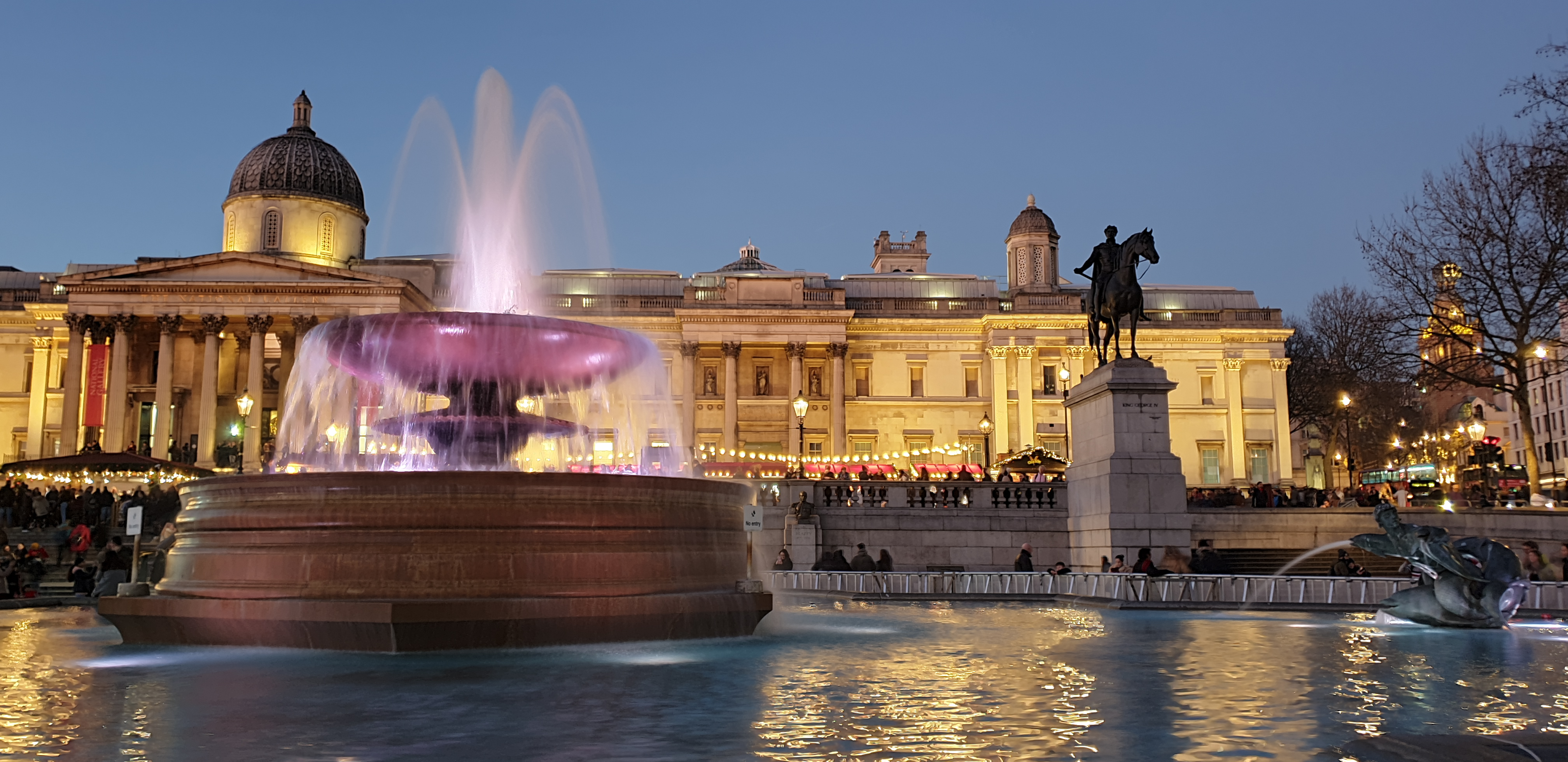
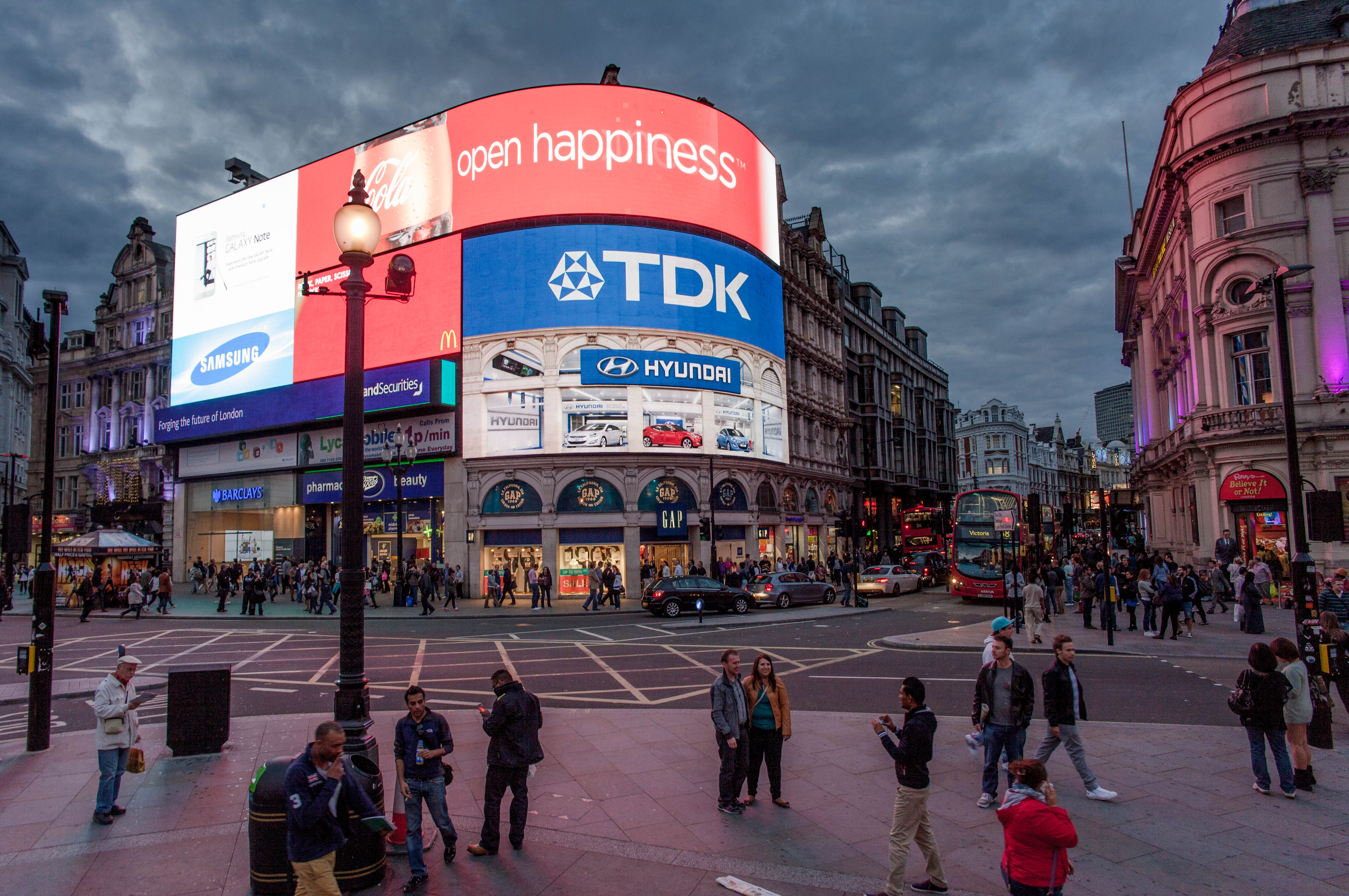
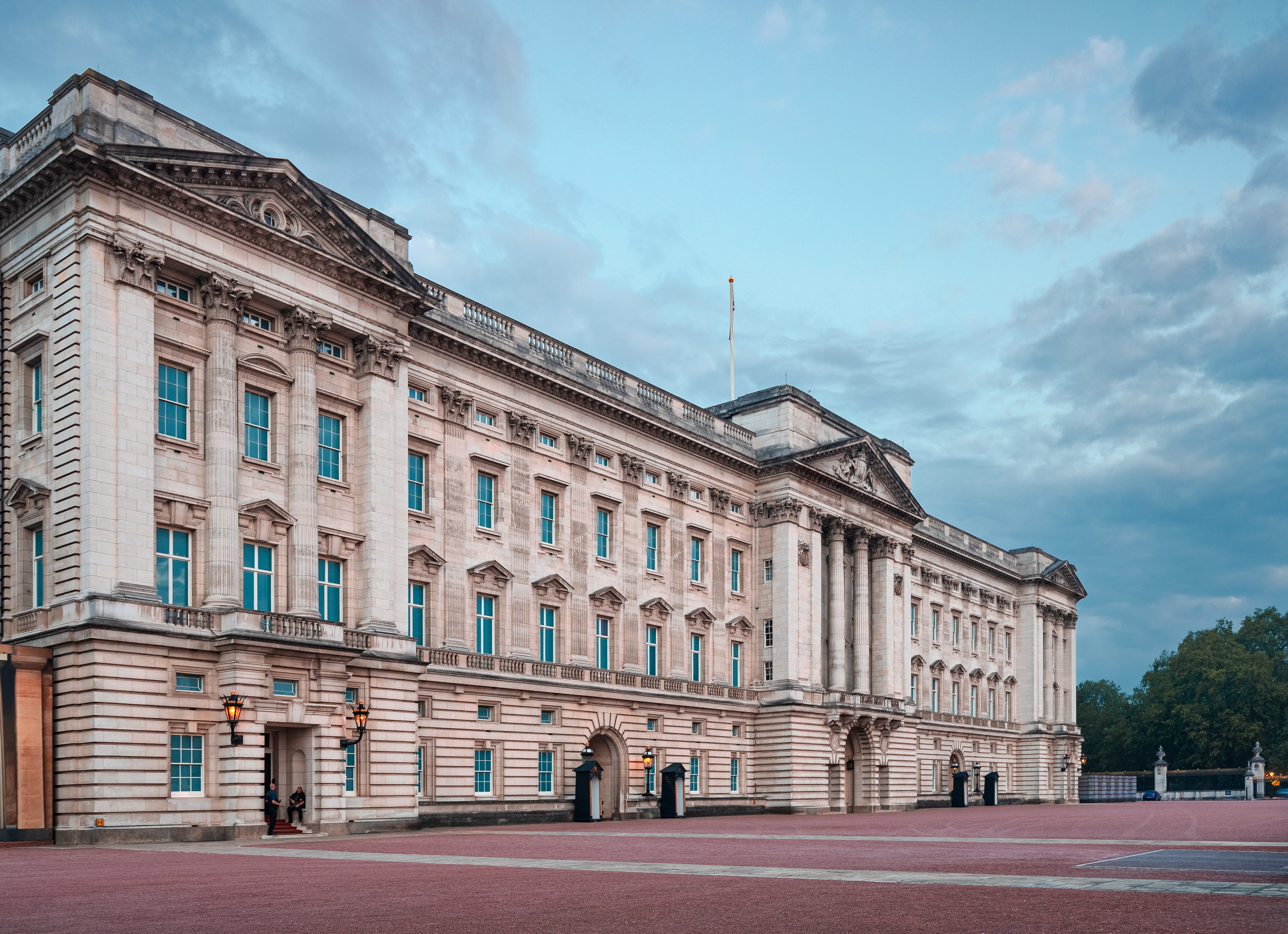
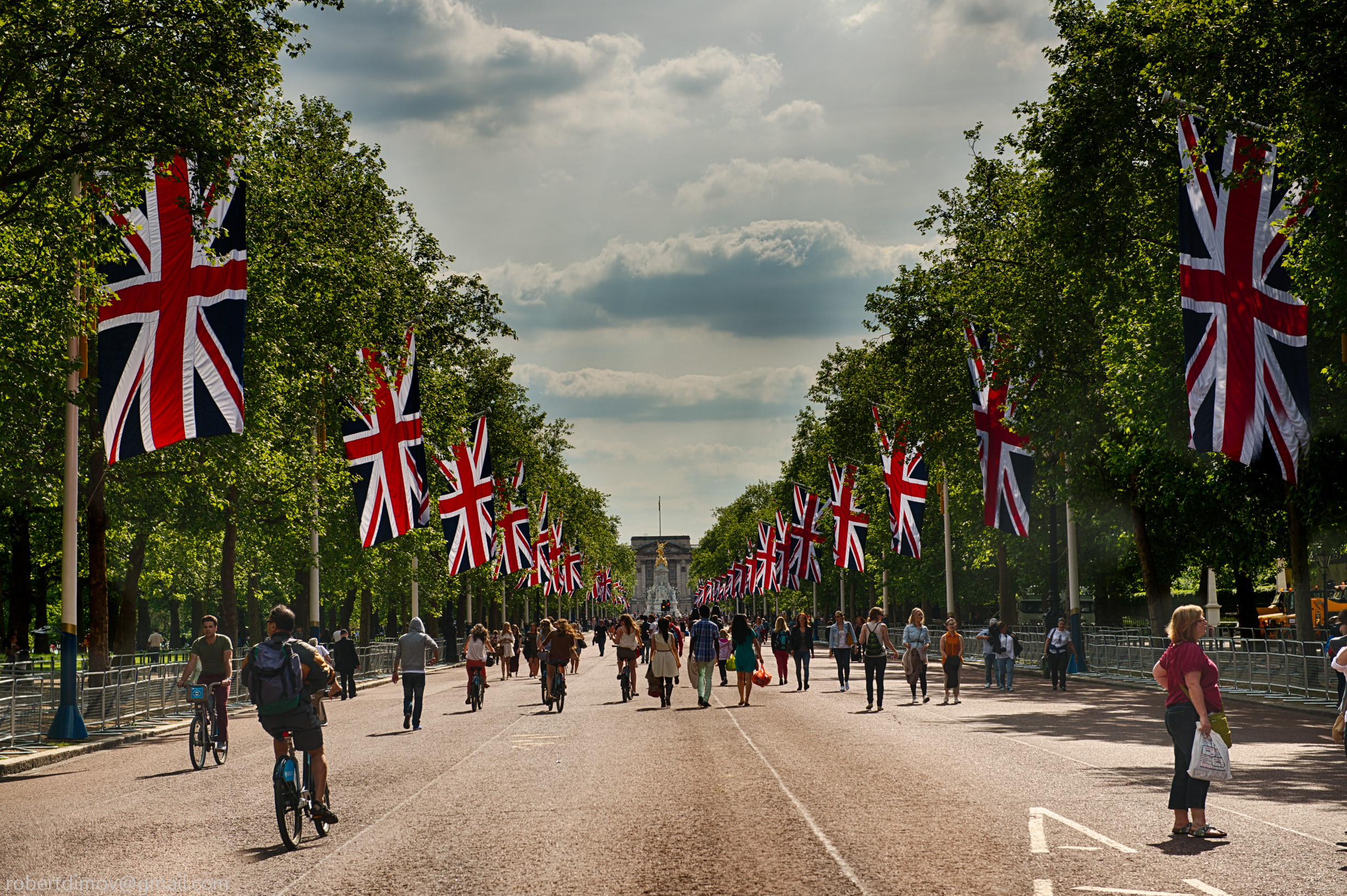
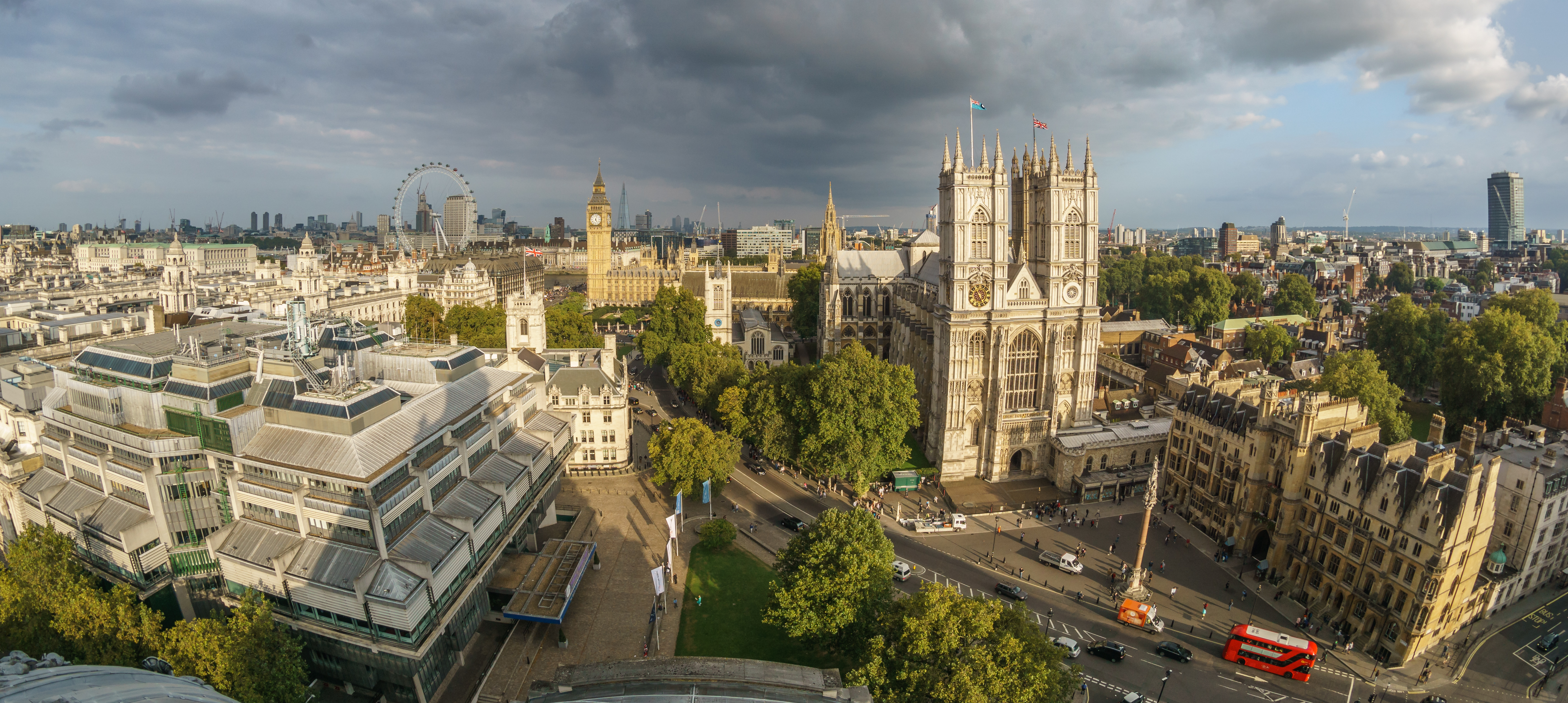
- Trafalgar Square Piccadilly Circus Buckingham Palace The Mall Westminster from Methodist Central Hall

- Coat of arms Council logo
- Motto: Custodi civitatem domine (O Lord, watch over the city)
- City of Westminster shown within Greater London
- Coordinates: 51°30′44″N 00°09′48″W
- Sovereign state: United Kingdom
- Country: England
- Region: London
- Ceremonial county: Greater London
- Created: 1 April 1965
- Admin HQ: City Hall, Victoria Street

Government
  - Type: London borough council
  - Body: Westminster City Council
  - London Assembly: James Small-Edwards (Labour) AM for West Central
  - MPs: Georgia Gould (Labour); Rachel Blake (Labour); Joe Powell (Labour)

Area
  - Total: 8.29 sq mi (21.48 km^{2})
  - Rank: 288th (of 296)

Population (2025)
  - Total: 212,367
  - Rank: 94th (of 296)
  - Density: 25,610/sq mi (9,887/km^{2})
- Time zone: UTC (GMT)
  - Summer (DST): UTC+1 (BST)
- Postcodes: EC, NW, SW, W, WC
- Area code: 020
- ISO 3166 code: GB-WSM
- ONS code: 00BK
- GSS code: E09000033
- Police: Metropolitan Police
- Website: westminster.gov.uk

The City of Westminster (/ˈwɛstˌmɪnstər/) is a London borough with city status in Greater London, England. It is the site of the United Kingdom's Houses of Parliament and much of the British government. It contains a large part of central London, including most of the West End, such as the major shopping areas around Oxford Street, Regent Street, Piccadilly and Bond Street, and the entertainment district of Soho. Many London landmarks are within the borough, including Buckingham Palace, Westminster Abbey, Whitehall, Westminster Cathedral, 10 Downing Street, and Trafalgar Square.

The borough also has a number of major parks and open spaces, including Hyde Park, and most of Regent's Park. Away from central London the borough also includes various inner suburbs, including St John's Wood, Maida Vale, Bayswater, Belgravia and Pimlico. The borough had a population of 204,300 at the 2021 census.

The original settlement of Westminster was historically a separate urban area to the west of London, growing up around the minster church of Westminster Abbey. Westminster was an important centre of royal authority from Saxon times, and was declared a city in 1540. It was gradually absorbed into the urban area of London, but London's official city boundaries remained unchanged, covering just the area called the City of London, broadly corresponding to the medieval walled city. From the 19th century some metropolis-wide administrative bodies were introduced. The County of London was created in 1889, replaced in 1965 by the larger administrative area of Greater London, which since 2000 has been led by the mayor of London. The cities of London and Westminster retain their separate city statuses despite having long been part of the same urban area.

The modern borough was created in 1965 as part of the same reforms which created Greater London, covering the area of the three former metropolitan boroughs of Westminster, Paddington and St Marylebone. The local authority is Westminster City Council. To the east, Westminster borders the City of London, with the boundary marked by Temple Bar. Other neighbouring boroughs (anti-clockwise from north-east) are Camden, Brent, Kensington and Chelsea, Wandsworth and Lambeth, the latter two being separated from Westminster by the River Thames. Charing Cross in Westminster is the notional centre of London, being the point from which distances from London are measured.

== History ==
After the depopulation of Roman London in the 5th century, an Anglo Saxon agricultural and trade settlement likely developed to its west, associated with the Middle Saxons, sometimes called Lundenwic ('London village' or London port'). Over time, Lundenburh ('London fort'), the former Roman city with its still-existing Roman walls, was repopulated and Lundenwic declined, becoming pastoral and partly known as Aldwych (Aldwic—'old village'), the name of which lives on for a section of Westminster.

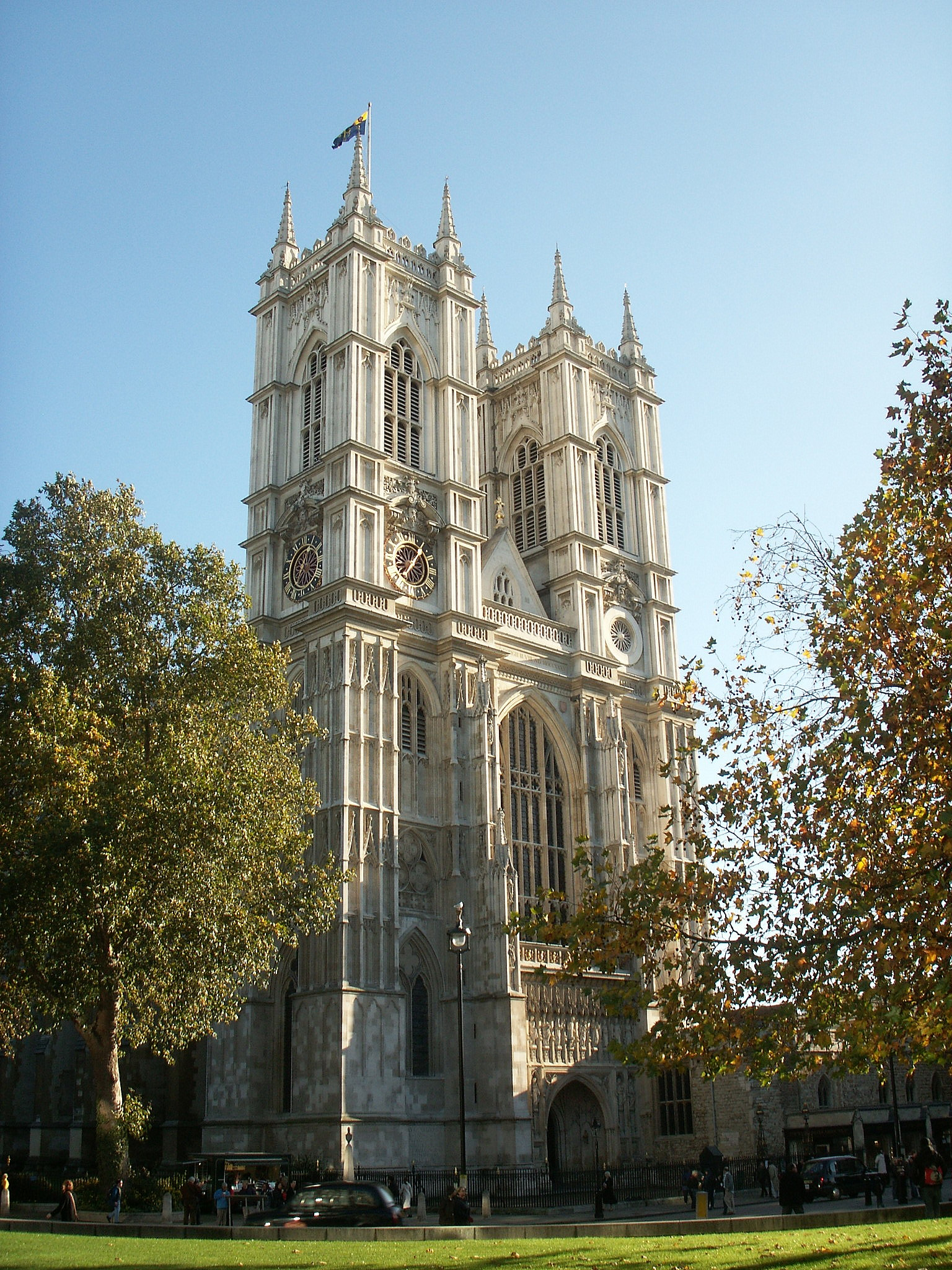
Westminster Abbey, around which the original settlement grew.

The origins of the City of Westminster pre-date the Norman Conquest of England. In the mid-11th century, King Edward the Confessor began the construction of an abbey at Westminster, only the foundations of which survive today. Between the abbey and the river he built a palace, thereby guaranteeing that the seat of Government would be fixed at Westminster, and inevitably drawing power and wealth west out of the old City of London.

For centuries Westminster and the City of London were geographically quite distinct. It was not until the sixteenth century that houses began to be built over the adjoining fields, eventually absorbing nearby villages such as Marylebone and Kensington, and gradually creating the vast Greater London that exists today.

Henry VIII's dissolution of the monasteries abolished the abbey at Westminster, although the former abbey church is still called Westminster Abbey. The church was briefly the cathedral of the Diocese of Westminster created from part of the Diocese of London in 1540, by letters patent which also granted city status to Westminster, a status retained after the diocese was abolished in 1550.

=== Administrative history ===
The area was historically part of the county of Middlesex. Whilst an important centre of royal authority from Saxon times, Westminster was not formally incorporated as a borough for local government purposes until 1900. However, it was declared a city in 1540 on the elevation of Westminster Abbey to being a cathedral. From at least 1545 there was also a Westminster parliamentary borough (constituency). The Anglican Diocese of Westminster was short-lived, being absorbed back into the Diocese of London in 1550. Despite having no borough corporation and having ceased to be the seat of a diocese, Westminster continued to be described as a city. In 1585 the Westminster Court of Burgesses was established to administer certain judicial powers in an area known as the City and Liberty of Westminster.

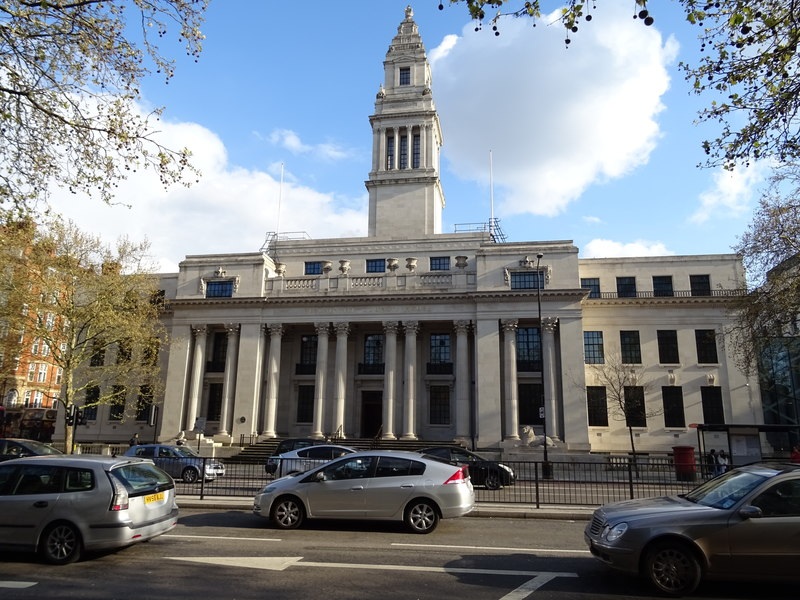
Westminster Council House is also known as Marylebone Town Hall. Completed in 1920 for the old St Marylebone Borough Council, it now serves as the main meeting place of Westminster City Council.

From 1856 the area was also governed by the Metropolitan Board of Works, which was established to provide services across the metropolis of London. In 1889 the Metropolitan Board of Works' area was made the County of London. From 1856 until 1900 the lower tier of local government within the metropolis comprised various parish vestries and district boards. Within the City and Liberty of Westminster, the three parishes of St George Hanover Square, St James Piccadilly and St Martin-in-the-Fields were governed by their vestries, whilst the parishes covering the central part of Westminster formed the Westminster District and the parishes and territories adjoining the border with the City of London formed the Strand District. Beyond the liberty to the north, the two parishes of Paddington and St Marylebone were also governed by their vestries. The Westminster District was renamed the St Margaret and St John Combined Vestry in 1887, and unsuccessfully petitioned to be incorporated as a borough in 1897.

In 1900 the lower tier of local government within the County of London was reorganised into metropolitan boroughs. The parish of Paddington became the Metropolitan Borough of Paddington, and the parish of the St Marylebone became the Metropolitan Borough of St Marylebone. The various territories within the old City and Liberty of Westminster became the Metropolitan Borough of Westminster. The new boroughs came into being on 1 November 1900; a few days ahead of that a royal charter was issued conferring city status on the new borough of Westminster from its creation. The Court of Burgesses, which had ceded most practical powers to the newer authorities, was finally abolished in 1901.

The modern borough was created in 1965 under the London Government Act 1963. It was a merger of the old Paddington, St Marylebone and Westminster metropolitan boroughs, and Westminster's city status was transferred to the enlarged borough. In 1966 the city was granted the right to appoint a lord mayor.

== Governance ==
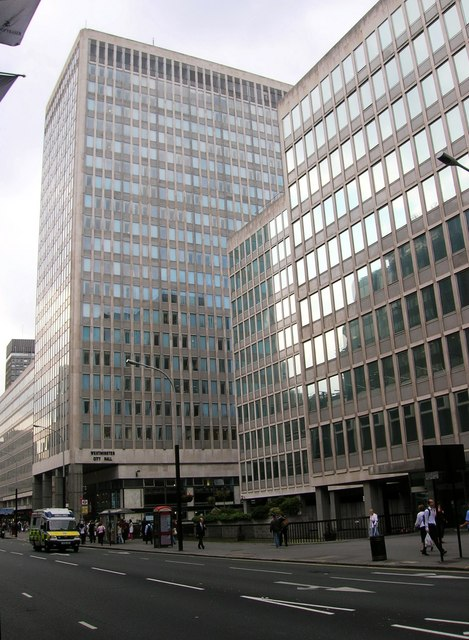
Westminster City Hall, completed in 1965, serves as council's main offices.

The local authority is Westminster City Council, which meets at Westminster Council House (also known as Marylebone Town Hall) and has its main offices at Westminster City Hall on Victoria Street.

=== Greater London representation ===
Since 2000, for elections to the London Assembly, the borough forms part of the West Central constituency.

=== UK Parliament ===
Evolution of Parliamentary representation
| 1918 | 1950 | 1974 | 1983 | 1997 | 2010 | 2024 |
|---|---|---|---|---|---|---|
| St Marylebone | | | Westminster North | Regent's Park and Kensington North | Westminster North | Queen's Park and Maida Vale |
| Paddington North | | Paddington | Westminster North | Regent's Park and Kensington North | Westminster North | Queen's Park and Maida Vale |
| Paddington South | | Paddington | Westminster North | Cities of London and Westminster | Westminster North | Queen's Park and Maida Vale |
| Westminster St George's | Cities of London and Westminster | | | Cities of London and Westminster | Cities of London and Westminster | Cities of London and Westminster |
| Westminster Abbey | Cities of London and Westminster | | | Cities of London and Westminster | Cities of London and Westminster | Cities of London and Westminster |
| City of London | Cities of London and Westminster | | | Cities of London and Westminster | Cities of London and Westminster | Cities of London and Westminster |

== Demographics ==
Population pyramid of the City of Westminster in 2021

Population
| Year | Pop. | ±% |
|---|---|---|
| 1801 | 220,188 | — |
| 1811 | 245,254 | +11.4% |
| 1821 | 288,851 | +17.8% |
| 1831 | 344,200 | +19.2% |
| 1841 | 368,910 | +7.2% |
| 1851 | 422,850 | +14.6% |
| 1861 | 446,263 | +5.5% |
| 1871 | 469,677 | +5.2% |
| 1881 | 493,090 | +5.0% |
| 1891 | 462,837 | −6.1% |
| 1901 | 441,857 | −4.5% |
| 1911 | 421,865 | −4.5% |
| 1921 | 396,406 | −6.0% |
| 1931 | 372,566 | −6.0% |
| 1941 | 334,448 | −10.2% |
| 1951 | 300,461 | −10.2% |
| 1961 | 267,126 | −11.1% |
| 1971 | 237,614 | −11.0% |
| 1981 | 163,893 | −31.0% |
| 1991 | 187,526 | +14.4% |
| 2001 | 181,279 | −3.3% |
| 2011 | 219,396 | +21.0% |
| 2021 | 204,236 | −6.9% |
| 2024 estimate | 209,996 | +2.8% |
Source: A Vision of Britain through time, citing Census population 2024 estimate

=== Ethnicity ===
Ethnic makeup of the Westminster including the City of London in 2021

The following table shows the ethnic group of respondents in the 1991 to 2021 censuses in Westminster.

| Ethnic group | Year | | | | | | | | | | | |
| Ethnic group | 1971 estimations | | 1981 estimations | | 1991 census | | 2001 census | | 2011 census | | 2021 census | |
| Ethnic group | Number | % | Number | % | Number | % | Number | % | Number | % | Number | % |
| White: Total | – | 93.1% | 163,612 | 85.6% | 148,461 | 79.1% | 132,715 | 73.12% | 135,330 | 61.68% | 112,732 | 55.1% |
|---|---|---|---|---|---|---|---|---|---|---|---|---|
| White: British | – | – | – | – | – | – | 87,938 | 48.51% | 77,334 | 35.25% | 57,162 | 28.0% |
| White: Irish | – | – | – | – | – | – | 6,574 | 3.63% | 4,960 | 2.26% | 3,742 | 1.8% |
| White: Gypsy or Irish Traveller | – | – | – | – | – | – | – | – | 76 | 0.03% | 49 | 0.0% |
| White: Roma | – | – | – | – | – | – | – | – | – | – | 1,503 | 0.7% |
| White: Other | – | – | – | – | – | – | 38,203 | 21.07% | 52,960 | 24.14% | 50,276 | 24.6% |
| Asian or Asian British: Total | – | – | 10,624 | 5.5% | 17,198 | 9.2% | 20,184 | 11.13% | 31,862 | 14.52% | 34,242 | 16.7% |
| Asian or Asian British: Indian | – | – | 2,604 | | 3,710 | | 5,665 | 3.12% | 7,213 | 3.29% | 7,965 | 3.9% |
| Asian or Asian British: Pakistani | – | – | 841 | | 1,240 | | 1,828 | 1.01% | 2,328 | 1.06% | 2,461 | 1.2% |
| Asian or Asian British: Bangladeshi | – | – | 1,768 | | 3,991 | | 5,000 | 2.76% | 6,299 | 2.87% | 7,533 | 3.7% |
| Asian or Asian British: Chinese | – | – | 2,270 | | 2,910 | | 4,077 | 2.25% | 5,917 | 2.70% | 6,625 | 3.2% |
| Asian or Asian British: Other Asian | – | – | 3,141 | | 5,347 | | 3,614 | 1.99% | 10,105 | 4.61% | 9,658 | 4.7% |
| Black or Black British: Total | – | – | 11,503 | 6% | 13,862 | 7.4% | 13,481 | 7.44% | 16,472 | 7.51% | 16,456 | 8% |
| Black or Black British: African | – | – | 3,295 | | 4,535 | | 5,613 | 3.10% | 9,141 | 4.17% | 10,451 | 5.1% |
| Black or Black British: Caribbean | – | – | 6,519 | | 7,163 | | 6,678 | 3.68% | 4,449 | 2.03% | 4,307 | 2.1% |
| Black or Black British: Other Black | – | – | 1,689 | | 2,164 | | 1,190 | 0.66% | 2,882 | 1.31% | 1,698 | 0.8% |
| Mixed or British Mixed: Total | – | – | – | – | – | – | 7,480 | 4.13% | 11,395 | 5.19% | 13,335 | 6.5% |
| Mixed: White and Black Caribbean | – | – | – | – | – | – | 1,382 | 0.76% | 1,869 | 0.85% | 2,061 | 1.0% |
| Mixed: White and Black African | – | – | – | – | – | – | 1,204 | 0.66% | 1,927 | 0.89% | 2,089 | 1.0% |
| Mixed: White and Asian | – | – | – | – | – | – | 2,436 | 1.34% | 3,584 | 1.63% | 3,718 | 1.8% |
| Mixed: Other Mixed | – | – | – | – | – | – | 2,458 | 1.36% | 4,015 | 1.83% | 5,467 | 2.7% |
| Other: Total | – | – | 5,284 | | 8,239 | | 7,426 | 4.10% | 24,337 | 11.09% | 27,471 | 13.5% |
| Other: Arab | – | – | – | – | – | – | – | – | 15,724 | 7.17% | 15439 | 7.6% |
| Other: Any other ethnic group | – | – | – | – | – | – | 7,426 | 4.1% | 8,613 | 3.93% | 12032 | 5.9% |
| Ethnic minority: Total | – | 6.9% | 27,411 | 14.4% | 39,299 | 20.9% | 48,571 | 26.79% | 84,066 | 38.32% | 91,504 | 44.9% |
| Total | – | 100% | 191,024 | 100% | 187,700 | 100% | 181,286 | 100.00% | 219,396 | 100.00% | 204,236 | 100% |

=== Religion ===
| Religion | 2001 | | 2011 | | 2021 | |
| Religion | Number | Of total | Number | Of total | Number | Of total |
|---|---|---|---|---|---|---|
| Christian | 99,797 | 55.05% | 97,877 | 44.61% | 76,245 | 37.3% |
| No religion | 29,300 | 16.16% | 44,542 | 20.30% | 52,936 | 25.9% |
| Muslim | 21,346 | 11.77% | 40,073 | 18.27% | 40,873 | 20.0% |
| Religion not stated | 15,877 | 8.76% | 20,519 | 9.35% | 19,179 | 9.4% |
| Jewish | 7,732 | 4.27% | 7,237 | 3.30% | 5,628 | 2.8% |
| Hindu | 3,497 | 1.93% | 4,178 | 1.90% | 4,457 | 2.2% |
| Buddhist | 2,392 | 1.32% | 3,194 | 1.46% | 2,603 | 1.3% |
| Other religion | 945 | 0.52% | 1,280 | 0.58% | 1,741 | 0.9% |
| Sikh | 400 | 0.22% | 496 | 0.23% | 573 | 0.3% |
| Total | 181,286 | 100.00% | 219,396 | 100.00% | 204,300 | 100.0% |

=== Housing ===
The borough ranks highest on one standard criteria in analysing housing supply and demand, the proportion of private rented accommodation relative to other types of housing in England.

=== Income inequality ===
A study in 2017 by Trust for London and the New Policy Institute found that Westminster has the third-highest pay inequality of the 32 London boroughs. It also has the second-least affordable private rent for low earners in London, behind only Kensington and Chelsea.

=== Education ===
In education, 82% of adults and 69% of 19-year-olds have Level 3 qualifications.

=== Immigration ===
This list includes top-15 sources of immigration to the City of Westminster for 2021 census:

| # | Country | Number |
|---|---|---|
| 1 | United States | 6,421 |
| 2 | Italy | 6,125 |
| 3 | France | 5,675 |
| 4 | India | 4,446 |
| 5 | Spain | 3,593 |
| 6 | Iraq | 3,328 |
| 7 | Bangladesh | 3,191 |
| 8 | China | 3,088 |
| 9 | Greece | 2,631 |
| 10 | Germany | 2,530 |
| 11 | Iran | 2,458 |
| 12 | Russia | 2,442 |
| 13 | Philippines | 2,415 |
| 14 | Ireland | 2,346 |
| 15 | Brazil | 2,249 |

== Districts ==
The City of Westminster covers all or part of the following areas of London:

- "Albertopolis" (shared with the Royal Borough of Kensington and Chelsea)
- Bayswater
- Belgravia (shared with the Royal Borough of Kensington and Chelsea)
- Covent Garden (shared with the London Borough of Camden)
- Fitzrovia (shared with the London Borough of Camden)
- Harrow Road
- Hyde Park
- Knightsbridge (shared with the Royal Borough of Kensington and Chelsea)
- Lisson Grove
- Maida Vale
- Mayfair
- Marylebone
- Millbank
- Paddington
- Pimlico
- Queen's Park (shared with the London Borough of Brent)
- St James's
- St John's Wood
- Soho, including Chinatown
- "Theatreland"
- Victoria
- Westbourne Green (shared with the Royal Borough of Kensington and Chelsea)
- West End (shared with the London Borough of Camden)
- Westminster City Centre

== Economy ==
Many global corporations have their global or European headquarters in the City of Westminster. Mayfair and St James's within the City of Westminster also have a large concentration of hedge fund and private equity funds. The West End is known as the Theatre District and is home to many of the leading performing arts businesses. Soho and its adjoining areas house a concentration of media and creative companies. Oxford Street is a busy shopping destination.

== Landmarks ==
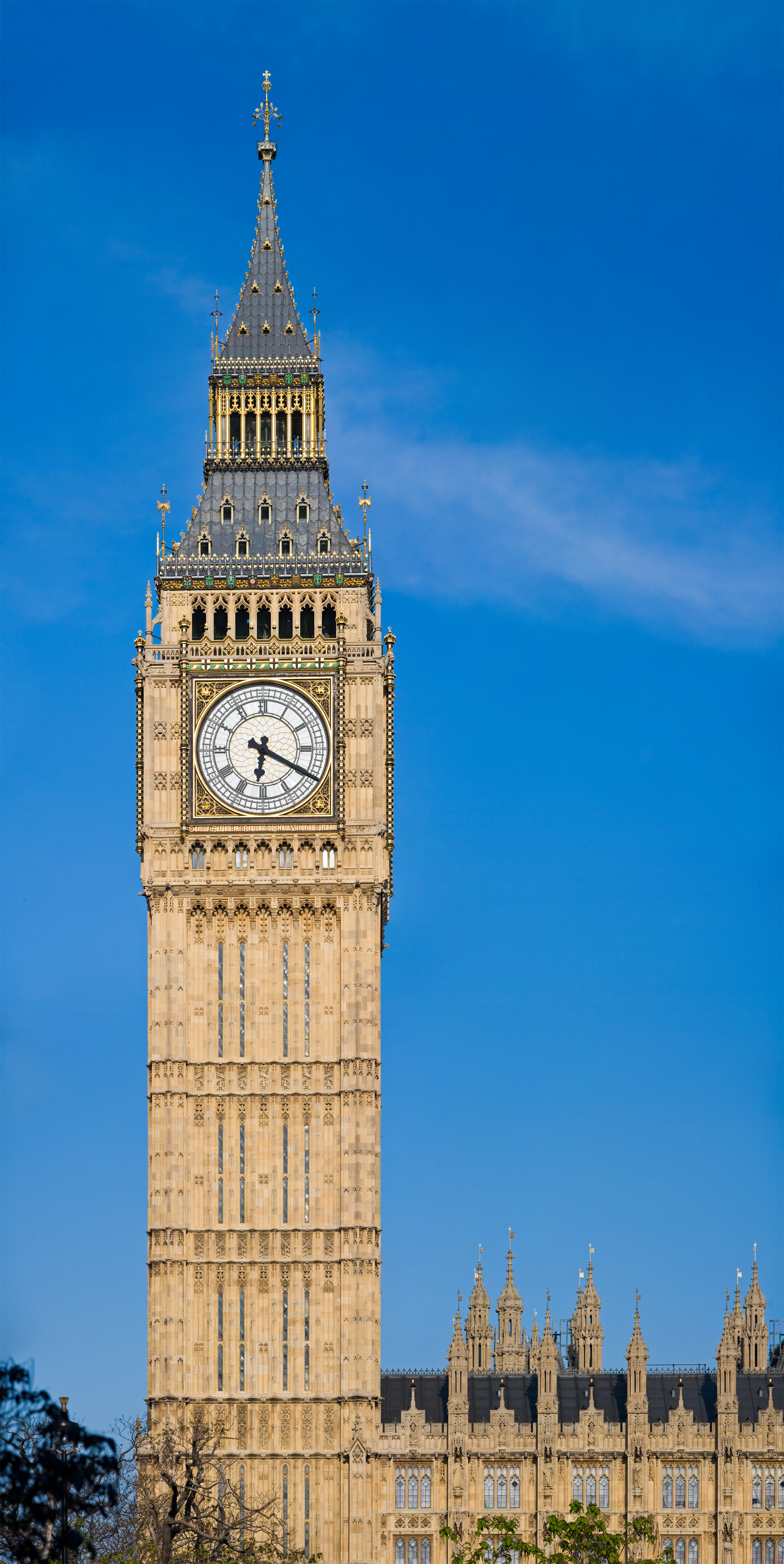
Big Ben is the nickname for the Great Bell of the clock at the north end of the Palace of Westminster and usually refers to both the clock and the clock tower (Elizabeth Tower).

The City of Westminster contains some of the most famous sites in London, including Buckingham Palace, Westminster Abbey, the Palace of Westminster (Houses of Parliament) and Big Ben.

=== Centre of London ===
Charing Cross is the notional centre of London and the location where distances from London are measured. This custom appears to have begun with the set distances of the 12 Eleanor crosses to Lincoln, England in the north, and expanded even after destruction of most of the crosses.

=== Parks and open spaces ===
These include Green Park, Hyde Park, Kensington Gardens, Regent's Park and St James's Park. In addition to parks and open spaces within the borough, the City owns and maintains East Finchley Cemetery and crematorium in the London Borough of Barnet.

== Transport ==
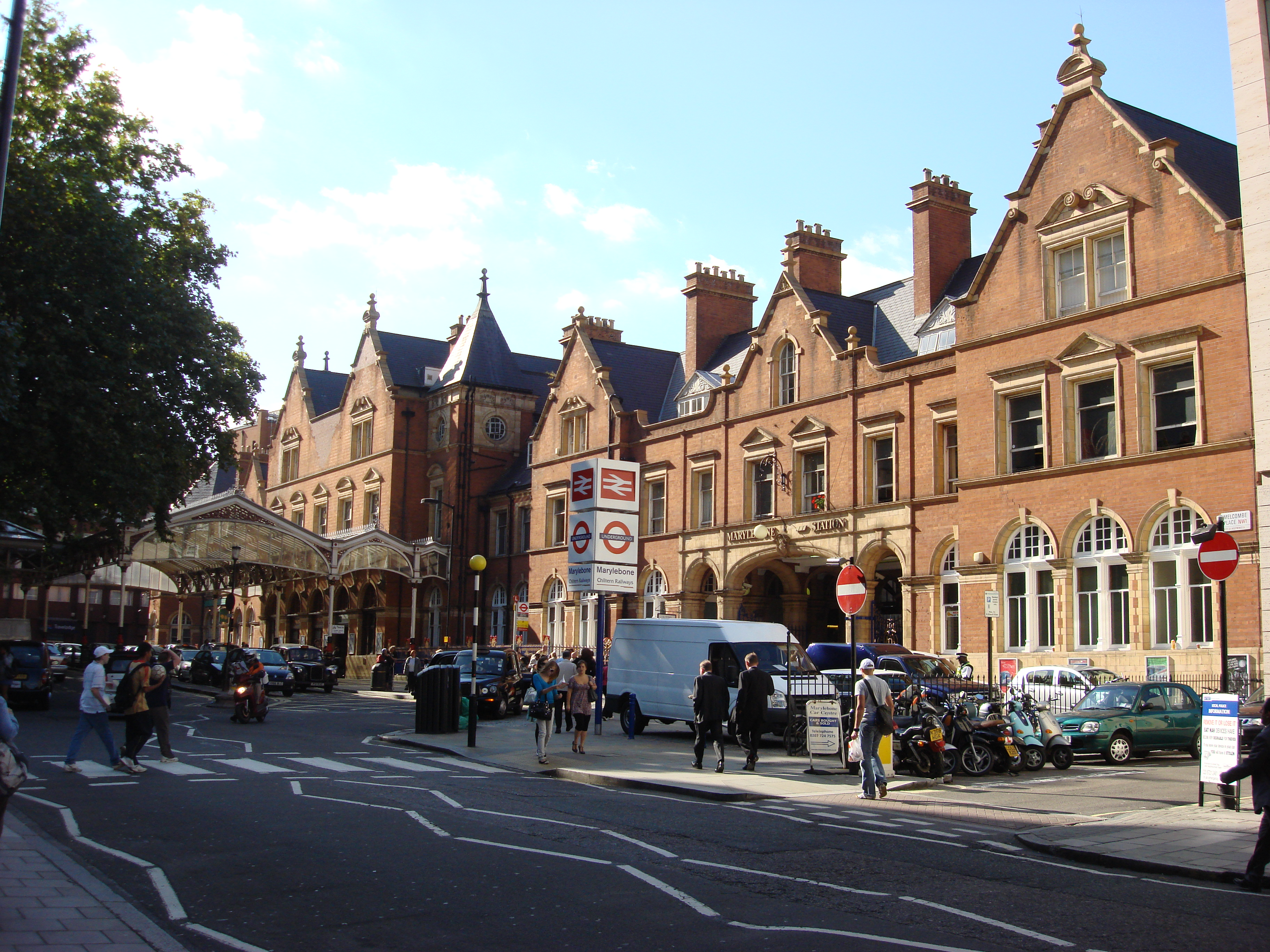
Marylebone station

=== National Rail stations ===
Four National Rail stations serve the City of Westminster:

Railway stations in the City of Westminster
| Station | Image | Line | Destinations |
|---|---|---|---|
| London Charing Cross | An image of Charing Cross Station with Southeastern trains at the platform. | South Eastern Main Line | South East London and Kent including London Bridge, Lewisham, Dartford, Orpington, Sevenoaks and Tunbridge Wells. Services operated by Southeastern. |
| London Marylebone | Marylebone station at night, with red benches and glowing departure boards. | Chiltern Main Line | North West London, Buckinghamshire, Oxfordshire and Midlands including Wembley Stadium, Harrow, Aylesbury, Oxford and Birmingham Moor Street. Services operated by Chiltern Railways. |
| London Paddington | Paddington railway station with sun shining through the arches built by Brunel | Great Western Main Line | West London, South West England and South Wales including Ealing Broadway, Reading, Bristol, Cardiff, Exeter, Oxford, Plymouth and Worcester. Services operated by Great Western Railway and Elizabeth line. Heathrow Airport Services operated by Heathrow Express and Elizabeth line. |
| London Victoria | Victoria station concourse. British flags hang from the ceiling. | Brighton and Chatham Main Lines | South East London and Kent including Peckham Rye, Dartford, Gravesend, Dover Priory and Ashford International. Services operated by Southeastern. South London, Sussex and the South Coast including Clapham Junction, Sutton, Brighton, Eastbourne, Gatwick Airport, Guildford, Portsmouth, and Southampton. Services operated by Southern. Gatwick Airport Services operated by Gatwick Express. |

=== London Underground ===
The City of Westminster is served by 27 London Underground stations and 10 of the 11 lines.

=== Electric charging points ===
By 2009 Westminster City Council had electric vehicle charging points in 15 locations through the city (13 car parks and two on-street points). Users pay an annual fee to cover administration costs to register and use the points. By 2018 there were 60 electric vehicle charging locations.

=== Travel to work ===
In March 2011, the main forms of transport that residents used to travel to work were: underground, metro, light rail, tram, 21.0% of all residents aged 16–74; on foot, 9.3%; bus, minibus or coach, 9.3%; driving a car or van, 6.0%; work mainly at or from home, 5.5%; bicycle, 3.1%; train, 3.0%.

== Education ==
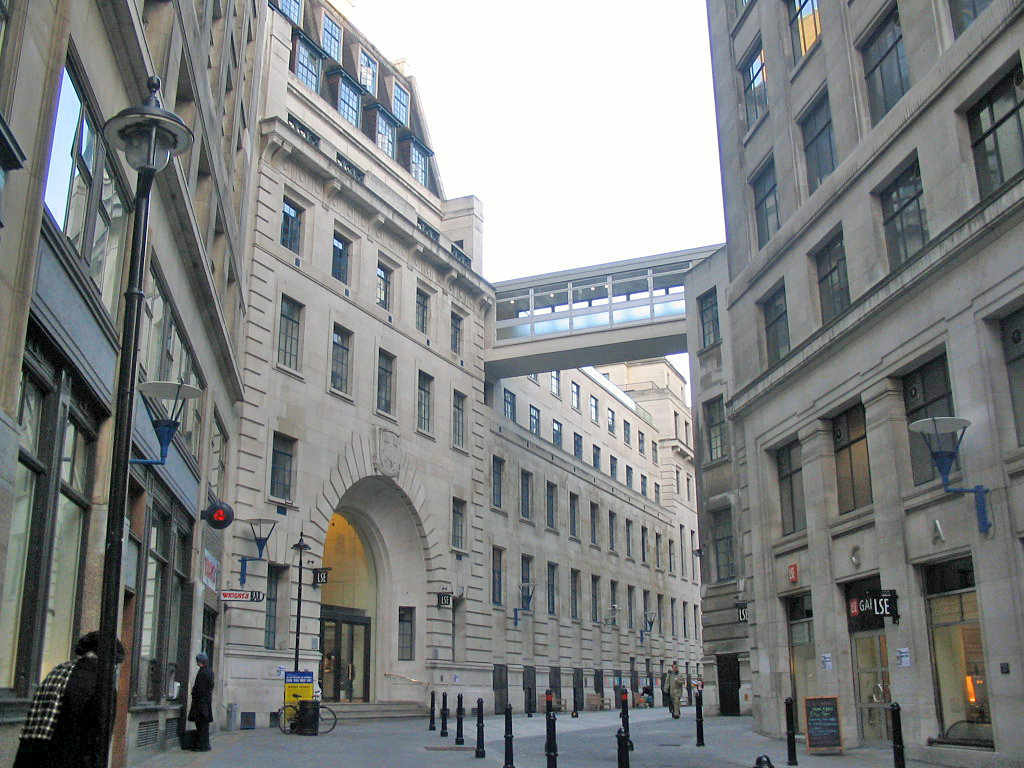
The main entrance to the London School of Economics

Westminster Children's Services administers many primary and secondary schools. In addition, there are several state-funded faith schools, primarily Church of England (CE), and Roman Catholic (RC), but Christian non-denominational (ND) schools are also in the borough, and there are several non-profit-making junior and senior independent schools.

=== Universities and colleges ===
- The University of Westminster has its three campuses in the borough; 309 Regent Street (with 4–12 / 16 Little Titchfield Street and 32 / 38 Wells Street buildings uniting under the same campus), 115 New Cavendish Street, and 29 / 35 Marylebone Road.
- The Strand campus of King's College London is located within the district.
- The London Business School, in Regent's Park.
- The London School of Economics, at Clare Market, near Aldwych.
- The Royal Academy of Music, on Marylebone Road.
- University of the Arts London has constituent colleges in Millbank (Chelsea College of Art and Design) and Oxford Street (London College of Fashion).
- The Courtauld Institute of Art, in Somerset House, Strand.
- Brigham Young University London Centre, on Palace Court.
- The northern half of Imperial College London's main South Kensington campus lies within the borough.
- City of Westminster College is a further education college with campuses on Paddington Green and at Queens Park. It also owns the Cockpit Theatre, which is used as a training and performance venue.
- Regent's College, whose campus is within the grounds of Regent's Park, which houses: European Business School London; Regent's American College London; Regent's Business School; School of Psychotherapy and Counselling; Webster Graduate School; Internexus, a provider of English language courses.
- Westminster Kingsway College is a further education college with centres in Soho and Victoria in Westminster. It also has centres in Camden.
- The Royal College of Art in Kensington Gore.

=== Public libraries ===
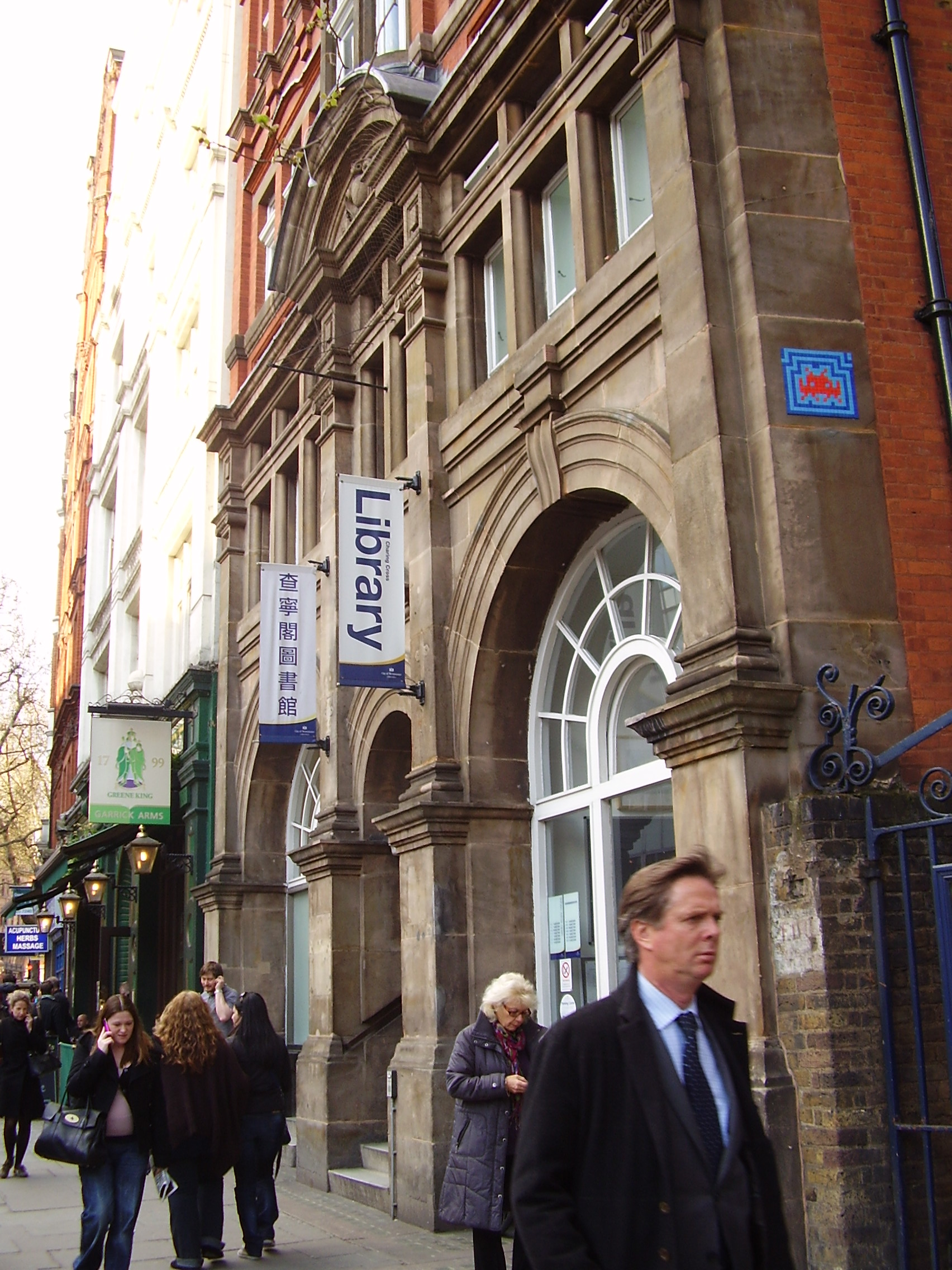
Charing Cross Library

The city operates two reference libraries; Westminster Reference Library and Marylebone Information Service. Westminster Reference Library holds several special collections: of which the Sherlock Holmes, Arts and Business collections are the most comprehensive. In addition to the collections in Westminster Reference Library the city has two specialist libraries: the Westminster Music Library, the largest music library in the UK and the Westminster Chinese Library in the Charing Cross Library.

Free City of Westminster operated public lending libraries in Westminster include:

- Charing Cross Library
- Church Street Library
- The Maida Vale Library
- Marylebone Library
- Mayfair Library
- Paddington Library
- Pimlico Library
- Queen's Park Library
- St. John's Wood Library
- Victoria Library

The London Library, an independent lending library funded by subscription, is at 14 St James's Square.

== Embassies and High Commissions ==
Many countries' and Commonwealth Nations' embassies or High Commissions are in Westminster.

== Coat of arms ==
Coat of arms of Westminster City Council at Westminster City Hall

The current Westminster coat of arms was given by an official grant on 2 September 1964.

Westminster had other arms before, which had a chief identical to the chief in the present arms. The symbols in the lower two thirds of the shield stand for former municipalities now merged with the city, Paddington and St Marylebone. The original arms had a portcullis as the main charge, which now forms the crest.

== Freedom of the City ==
The following people and military units have received the Freedom of the City of Westminster.

=== Individuals ===
- Sir Winston Churchill: 1946.
- Sir Robert Mark: 22 June 1977.
- Margaret Thatcher, Baroness Thatcher: 12 December 1990.

=== Military units ===
- HMS Westminster, RN: 11 December 2005.

== See also ==
- History of local government in London
- History of London
- List of churches in the City of Westminster
- River Westbourne
- Tri-borough shared services
- Westminster St Margaret and St John
