= Harold Rutland =

English pianist, music critic and composer

Harold Rutland (August 21, 1900 – July 23, 1977) was a British pianist, music critic and composer. He began studying at the Guildhall School of Music, became organ scholar at Queens' College, Cambridge, and completed his studies at the Royal College of Music with Herbert Fryer, Arthur Bliss and Adrian Boult. A contemporary at the RCM in the early 1920s was Constant Lambert. Earning his living as an organist, choirmaster and pianist, he lived in Cheyne Walk, Chelsea during the late 1920s.

In the early part of the war he toured the provinces with Lambert, playing the piano for the Sadler's Wells Ballet (then known as the Vic Wells Ballet), substituting for an orchestra. From 1941 until 1956 he worked at the BBC and was a frequent contributor to the Radio Times, a broadcaster of talks on music and an accompanist. From 1957 to 1960 he was editor of the Musical Times with Robin Hull his assistant and eventual (though unfortunately very short-lived) successor. He then took on the role of lecturer and examiner at Trinity College of Music, involving much travel abroad. He was the author of the book Trinity College of Music: The First Hundred Years (1972).

Through E J Moeran, Rutland met John Ireland in 1926, and became a long-standing advocate of his music. He chaired the John Ireland Society from 1960 until his death. Kaikhosru Sorabji was also a friend of Rutland's and dedicated some of his works to him, including the Fourth Symphony for Piano Alone. Rutland became a champion of Sorabji’s music, describing him as "one of the very few I would unhesitatingly describe as a genius […] I will only add that I have always felt honoured by your friendship, and not a little unworthy of it; indeterminate dabbler that I am." He gave the first performance of Sorabji's Fragment for Harold Rutland at the Aeolian Hall in London on 12 October 1927. Eric Blom in the Manchester Guardian reported that it was "received with a mixture of derision, indignation, and bewilderment".

His compositions include a Siciliana and a Toccata, both for piano, published by the Oxford University Press, and songs such as To the Moon (setting Shelley), published by Curwen. Mark Hambourg recorded his arrangements of Two Sea Shanties in 1928.

Rutland lived at 27, Eccleston Square in London. After his death in July 1977 he bequeathed has collection of books, scores and musical materials to the Central Music Library, Westminster. There is a sketch of him by the artist Juliet Pannett.
