= Winifred Christie =

British pianist and composer

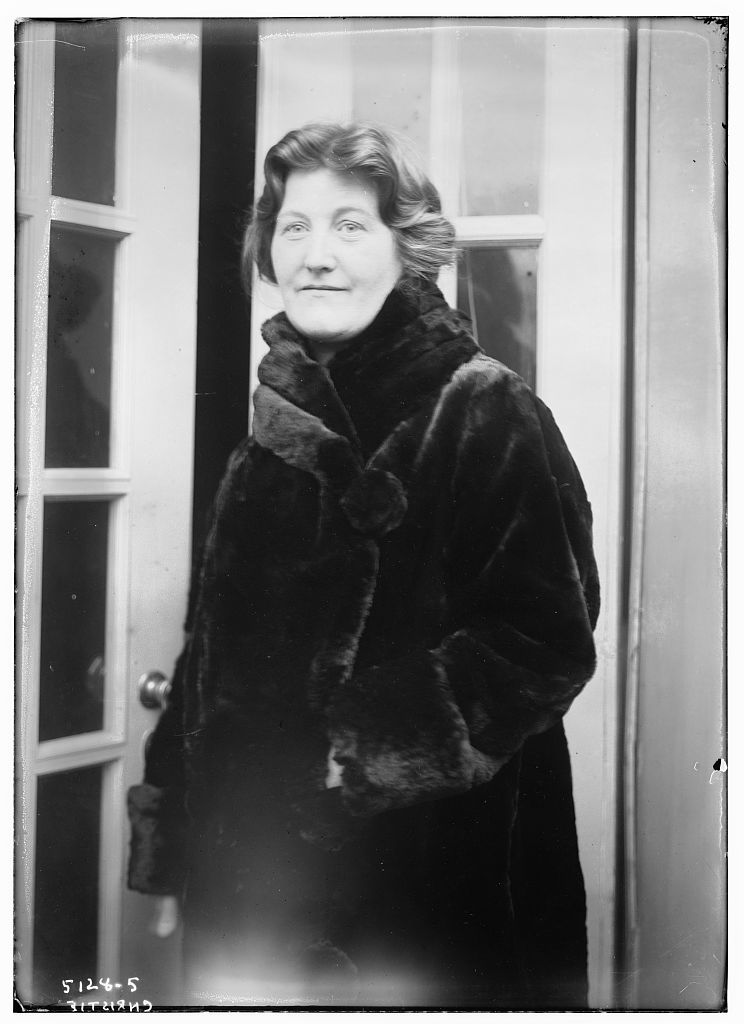
Winifred Christie in 1920

Winifred Christie (26 February 1882 – 8 February 1965) was a British pianist and composer best known as an advocate of the Moór-Duplex piano.

== Early career ==
Christie was born in Stirling, Scotland. She came to London as a child and first performed in public at the age of six. Winning the Liszt Scholarship she studied at the Royal Academy of Music under Oscar Beringer (piano) and Stewart Macpherson (harmony). There was a period of further study abroad with Harold Bauer. She made her London debut at St James's Hall on 3 December 1903, then embarked on extensive tours of the UK, Germany, Holland, France and the United States, where she lived between 1915 and 1919.

== The Moór-Duplex piano ==
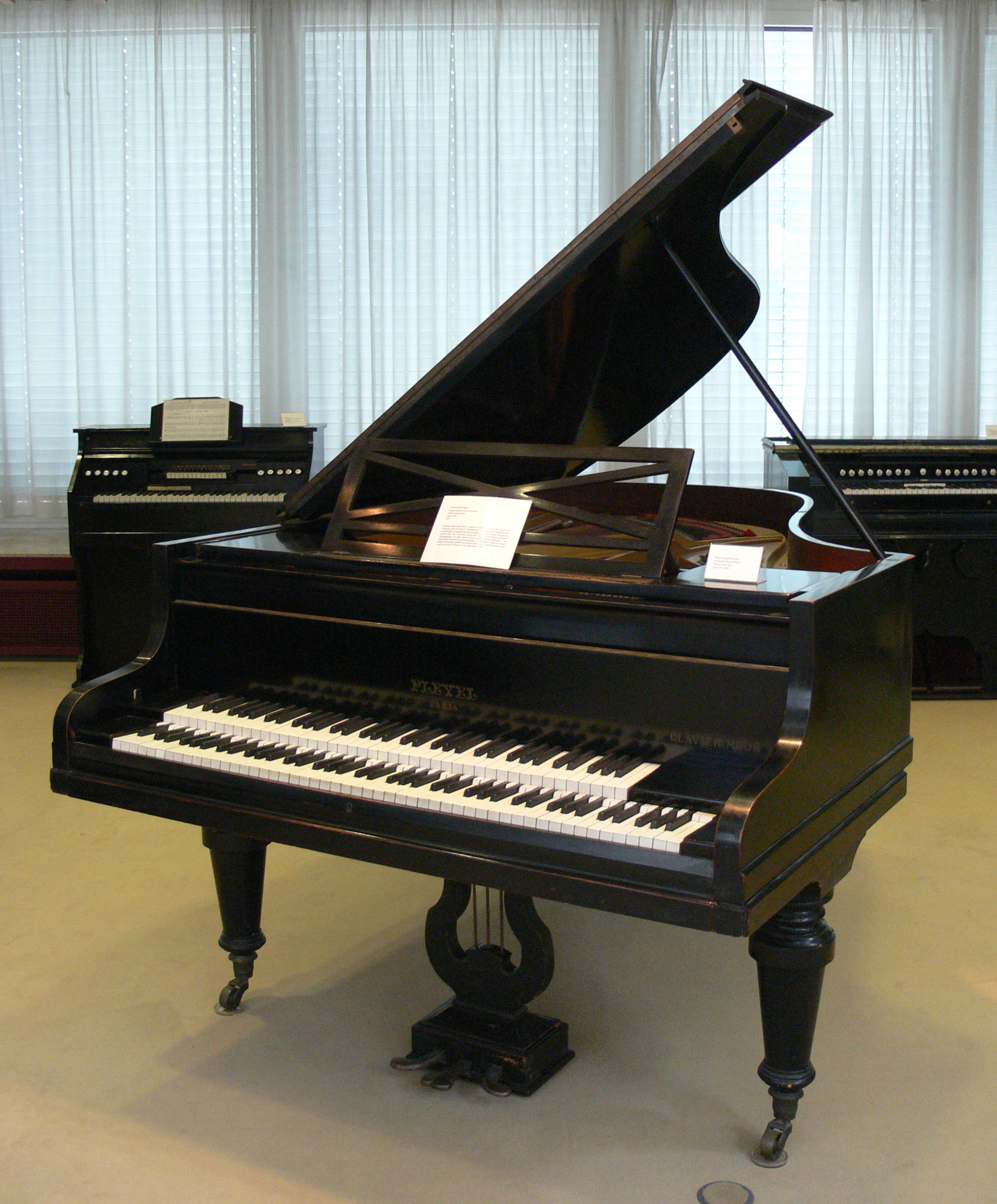
A piano with two keyboards

Christie spent a significant portion of her career promoting the Moór-Duplex piano, a double keyboard with a coupler between the two manuals (an octave apart), invented in 1920 by Christie’s husband, Hungarian pianist, inventor and composer Emanuel Moór, whom she married in 1923. The Moór-Duplex aided in the playing of octaves, tenths, and even chromatic glissandos.

Christie performed on the instrument frequently in Europe and the United States and published (in collaboration with Moór) a manual of technical exercises for the instrument.

== Performances and recordings ==
Christie premiered the Concert Study by Eugene Goossens at the Aeolian Hall in London on 1 June 1915, and, in New York, on 23 February 1916, the piano version of Charles Tomlinson Griffes' The White Peacock at New York's Punch & Judy Theatre. Christie may have premiered The Fountain of the Acqua Paola and Nightfall by Griffes at Boston's Jordan Hall in 1919 (status of performance as a premiere suggested by the composer in correspondence).

She was the soloist in the second performance of Edgar Bainton’s Concerto-Fantasia in Brighton on 12 January 1922, conducted by the composer, and in the first London performance at the Royal Philharmonic Society Concert, Queen's Hall, on 26 January 1922. She performed her husband's Piano Sonata, op. 103 for the Moór-Duplex piano in February 1922 at the Aeolian Hall. Christie was among the earliest performers to tackle John Ireland's formidable E minor Piano Sonata of 1920.

Christie also recorded selectively for the Aeolian Vocalion and Winner recording labels. Her 1921 recording of Moritz Rosenthal’s Papillons (1897) pre-dates the composer’s own recordings of his work.

She was also a composer of piano concertos, chamber music and solo piano works, but these have now been forgotten.

== Death and legacy ==
In 1946, Christie founded and endowed the Westminster Central Music Library in London with a gift of £10,000 as a memorial to her late husband, who died in 1931.

There is a scholarship fund in Christie's name, at the Royal Academy of Music in London, originally intended to promote the Moór Piano but later given to keyboard students who perform particularly well at audition.

Christie died, aged 82, in London.
