= Parks and open spaces in the City of Westminster =

Public spaces in London, England

The City of Westminster, a central London borough, has 116 parks and open spaces; these include small gardens, as well as larger areas of land. The open spaces are managed by Westminster City Council and private resident and business associations. Westminster is also home to four of the Royal Parks (Hyde Park, Green Park, St James's Park and Kensington Gardens). The Royal Parks are managed by Royal Parks.

Westminster has a selection of typical London squares and formal gardens. Among the sites are:

- Brown Hart Gardens
- Cavendish Square Gardens
- College Garden
- Golden Square
- Grosvenor Square, the site of the Canadian High Commission and the current US Embassy
- Hanover Square
- Leicester Square
- Manchester Square
- Mount Street Gardens
- Paddington Recreation Ground
- Pimlico Gardens
- Regent's Park (partly)
- Victoria Embankment Gardens
- Victoria Tower Gardens (managed by Royal Parks)

The only Local Nature Reserve in the borough is St. John's Wood Church Grounds. In addition to parks and open spaces within the borough, the City owns and maintains East Finchley Cemetery in the London Borough of Barnet.
