= Robin Hull (music critic) =

British music critic (1905-1960)

Robert Hoare Hull (18 October 1905 – 6 August 1960), better known under the name Robin Hull, was a music critic specializing in contemporary British music, particularly Arnold Bax and Frederick Delius.

== Early career ==
Born at Limpsfield, Surrey, Hull was educated at Malvern College in Worcestershire. While there he studied with the organist and composer Frank Henry Shera (1882-1956), and also learned piano and clarinet. He went on to the Royal College of Music, studying composition with George Dyson, organ with George Thalben-Ball, and playing clarinet in the student orchestra under Malcolm Sargent, while taking additional private harmony and counterpoint lessons from Harold Darke. There is a portrait of him at the age of 17, painted by Henry Harris Brown. From 1925 he continued music and English literature studies at Worcester College, Oxford. Hull composed a setting of William Blake's War-Song to Englishmen, published by Oxford University Press in 1928. There were also a few piano pieces and settings of the Magnificat and Nunc Dimittis.

== Organist and critic ==
Hull accepted deputy organist posts at several churches. In 1929 he began working as a freelance author and music critic, using the byline Robert H. Hull. His work appeared in the Monthly Musical Record, the Radio Times and The Listener. From 1934 he was assistant music critic to the Morning Post, until it merged with The Daily Telegraph in 1937. He was an occasional broadcaster on BBC Radio and wrote programme notes for the Proms and other BBC concerts. From the late 1930s, when he was living in Basingstoke, he began using the name Robin Hull for his journalism. His friend, the clarinettist and music publisher Alan Frank, used to style him as "all readers Robin". During the war he served in the Royal Artillery between 1939 and 1942.

== Author ==
Hull wrote two short books for Leonard and Virginia Woolf's Hogarth Essays series: Contemporary Music in 1927 and Delius in 1928, and another on Bax four years later for Murdoch & Co, analysing his first four symphonies. He was a contributor to the Pelican mass-market paperbacks British Music of our Time (1948) and The Symphony (1949). In 1958 he began work on another book, Music in England, 1760-1860, but it remained unfinished.

== Last years ==
Persistent ill-health dogged his professional career. In October 1958 Hull was appointed as assistant editor of The Musical Times under Harold Rutland, and succeeded Rutland as editor in April 1960. But he died only four months later "after a short and painful illness". At the end of his life he was living in the village of Belmont, near Sutton in Surrey, where he died.
