= Leopold Albu =

Leopold Albu (1860–1937) was a gold magnate. He was born in Berlin, Prussia. He arrived in South Africa in 1875 and settled in Kimberley, Northern Cape with his brother George. In 1891, he moved to Johannesburg. Later, he served as a resident-partner in London, co-founding the General Mining and Finance Corporation.

== Sources ==
- Ensiklopedie van Suidelike Afrika, Eric Rosenthal, 1967
- Jones, J. D. F. (1995). Through fortress and rock : the story of Gencor, 1895-1995. Johannesburg: J. Ball Publishers. ISBN 1868420299. OCLC 34396102.
