= Emánuel Moór =

Hungarian composer, pianist and inventor

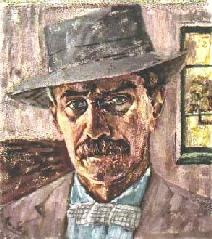
Emánuel Moór, self-portrait.

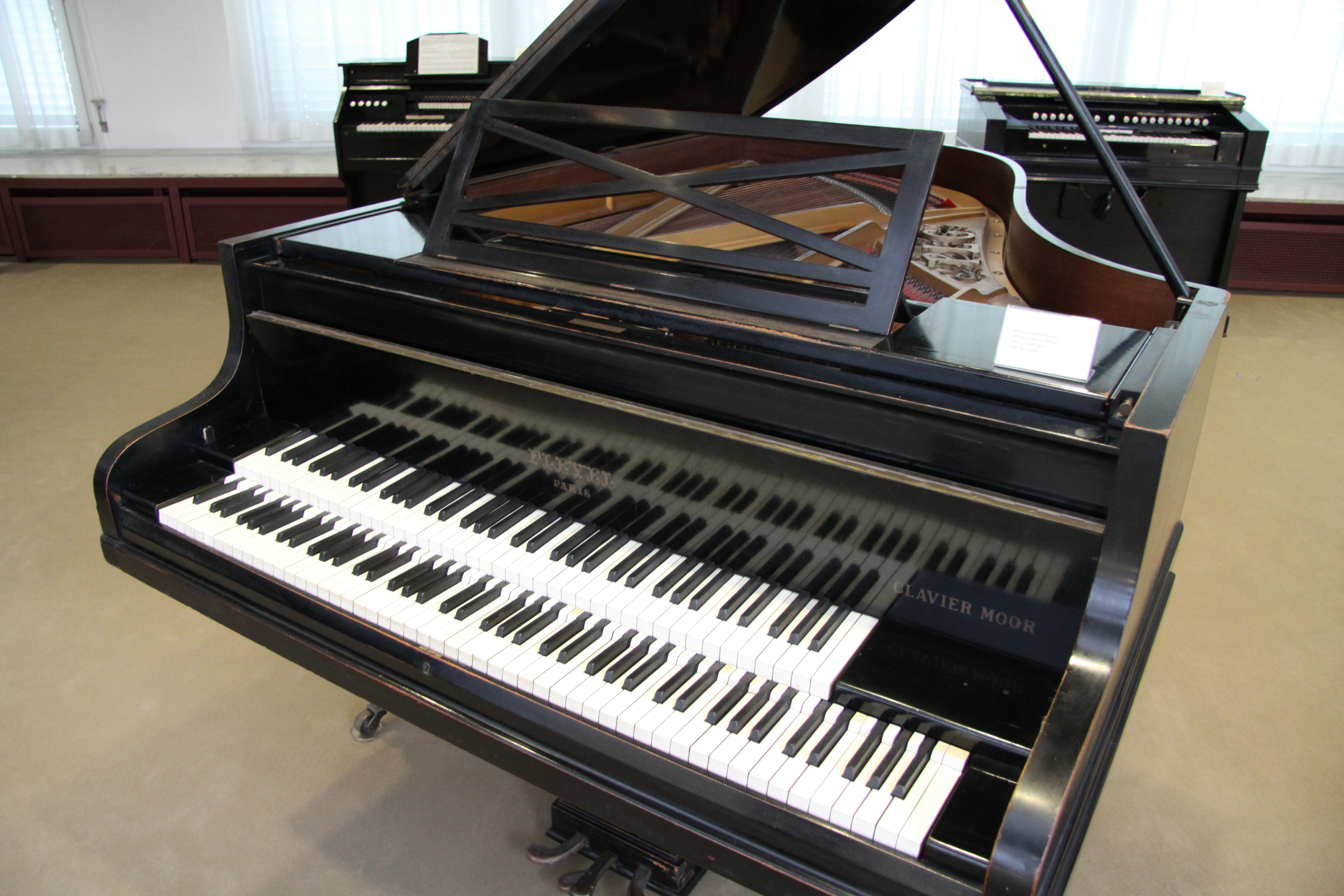
Emánuel Moór Pianoforte from around 1927 by Pleyel et Cie

Emánuel Moór (Hungarian pronunciation: [moːr]; 19 February 1863 – 20 October 1931) was a Hungarian composer, pianist, and an inventor of musical instruments. He is best known for his double piano, known as the Moór-Duplex piano.

== Life ==
Moór was born in Kecskemét, Hungary, and studied in Prague, Vienna and Budapest. Between 1885 and 1897 he toured Europe as a soloist and ventured as far afield as the United States.

His output of compositions amounted to 151 works including five operas, eight symphonies, four concertos for piano, four for violin, two for cello, a viola concerto and a harp concerto. Included in his works were also a triple concerto for violin, cello, and piano; chamber music; a requiem; and many songs. His three Piano Trios (in D major, op. 74, in C major, op. 81 and in B♭ major, op. 89), have been recorded by the Storioni Trio. They show the influence of Brahms, who befriended Moór.

His best-known invention was the Emánuel Moór Pianoforte, which consisted of two keyboards lying one above each other and allowed, by means of a tracking device, one hand to play a spread of two octaves.

He died, aged 68, in Chardonne, Switzerland. The Canadian pianist Max Pirani wrote a biography of Moór in 1959, with a preface by Pablo Casals.

== Two new instruments ==
In 1921 Emánuel Moór sparked a lively controversy in the world of music by presenting two revolutionary inventions in quick succession. First, "a giant violin, one and a half meters long, with five to six strings to reach the length of the cello, the bow being moved by a pedal". The second was the Moór-Duplex piano, a piano with two keyboards, the lower keyboard of which has its raised white keys to allow chromatic glissando and a pedal intermediate coupling the two keyboards - not to mention an ingenious system which made it possible to imitate a harpsichord.

Only about 60 of the double-keyboard pianos were made, mostly by Bosendorfer. Bechstein, Chickering and Steinway made a few. Marie de Jarowslawska-Tutundjian [de Vartavan] (18 May 1887 – 20 November 1963) helped with early trials of the Duplex-Coupler. She played it on 3 November 1921 at the Palace of Montreux, and at least once again on 16 November 1921. Marie was a talented pianist who had been playing in public since the age of eight in Brazil. She lived in Lausanne, where she taught at the Ribeaupierre Institute.

Moór's second wife, the Scottish pianist Winifred Christie, performed on the instrument frequently in Europe and the United States and published (in collaboration with Moór) a manual of technical exercises for the instrument.

== Ravel, Casals ==
Maurice Ravel said that the Emánuel Moór Pianoforte produced the sounds he had really intended in some of his own works, if only it had been possible to write them for two hands playing on a standard piano.

Anatoly Brandukov, dedicatee of Moór's Cello Sonata No. 2 in G major, Op. 55, introduced the composer to Pablo Casals. Casal's first meeting is recorded in nearly every biography about Casals. In his own words Casals said, "His music was overwhelming….and the more he played, the more convinced I became that he was a composer of the highest order. When he stopped, I said simply, ‘You are a genius.’"

This meeting was the beginning of a long friendship between the two with Casals performing and premiering Moór's compositions, several of which were dedicated to Casals. For example, Casals gave four performances of the Cello Sonata No. 2 in G major in December 1905 alone following his initial meeting with the composer earlier in the year. Casals's first noted performance of this sonata came during a Russian tour (pianist not noted) followed by two performances with Marie Panthès in Geneva and Lausanne and one performance in Paris with Alfred Cortot at the piano.

Casals also championed other works by Moór, performing multiple sonatas, a concerto that Moór dedicated to him, a double cello concerto, and a triple concerto for piano trio with orchestra.

== Timothy Baxter ==
Supported by a scholarship from Winifred Christie Moór, the Danish-based British composer Timothy Baxter (1935–2021), then a student (later a professor) at the Royal Academy of Music, wrote his Six Bagatelles for double keyboard in 1964. The work was performed by Jeffery Harris on 24 August 1976 at the Three Choirs Festival in Hereford. Jeffery Harris held the Winifred Christie Moór Scholarship at the Royal Academy of Music before Timothy Baxter. The scholarship stopped, when Winifred Christie died after an accident in her home. Baxter also made some arrangements for the instrument because of its interesting possibilities.

The Six Bagatelles were later arranged for two pianos with a first performance in Arcueille during the Festival Erik Satie on 17 May 2013, played by Elsa Sorvari and Viktor Bogino. They played the work twice more in 2013, once in Paris. The Bagatelles have since been performed in Denmark, and have been recorded by the pianists Anne Mette Stæhr and Ulrich Stærk.
