= West End Arts Library =

Arts library in London

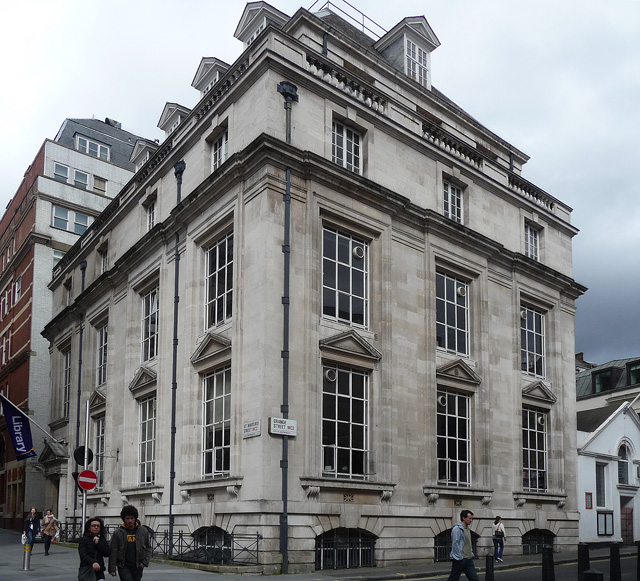
- 51°30′35″N 0°07′47″W
- Location: St Martin's Street; London, WC2H
- Type: Public Library
- Established: 8 October 1928 (97 years ago)
- Architect: A. N. Prentice

Collection
- Items collected: Books, sheet music, art and manuscripts.
- Size: 89,080 (2022)

Access and use
- Access requirements: Open to the general public, a Westminster library card is needed to borrow items or use computers.

Other information
- Website: https://www.westminster.gov.uk/leisure-libraries-and-community/library-opening-times-and-contact-details/west-end-arts-library

Listed Building – Grade II
- Official name: West End Arts Library
- Designated: 17 March 2016
- Reference no.: 1430775

West End Arts Library, previously called the Westminster Reference Library, is an arts library in St Martin's Street, London, in the City of Westminster, part of the Westminster Libraries & Archives network.

== History ==
The library was opened by W. Foxley Norris, dean of Westminster, on 8 October 1928 to replace the former library of the parish of St Martin in the Fields. The Leicester Fields chapel, built by the Huguenots in 1693, was once located on the site. Isaac Newton lived on a house on the site from 1710 to 1727, and later the house was occupied by the novelist Fanny Burney. The cellars of that house are part of the current building. The library was designed by the architect A. N. Prentice for Westminster City Council, and built by Walden & Company of Reading. It was modified in the 1950s and 1980s.

== Collections ==
The library includes a specialist fine art and performing arts collection as well as a Music Library on the first floor.

Since 2021 the library has also been home to the Westminster Music Library collection, which was formerly based at Victoria Library. Westminster Music Library is one of the largest public music libraries in the UK, holding a wide range of sheet music, scores, and books about music.

== Events and exhibitions ==
Outside library opening hours the library has hosted many events and concerts including Telemachus, Sea Power, Mr Hudson and The Library, Polar Bear, Harry Keyworth, Chisara Agor, Piney Gir and The Real Tuesday Weld.

The library also has art exhibition spaces.

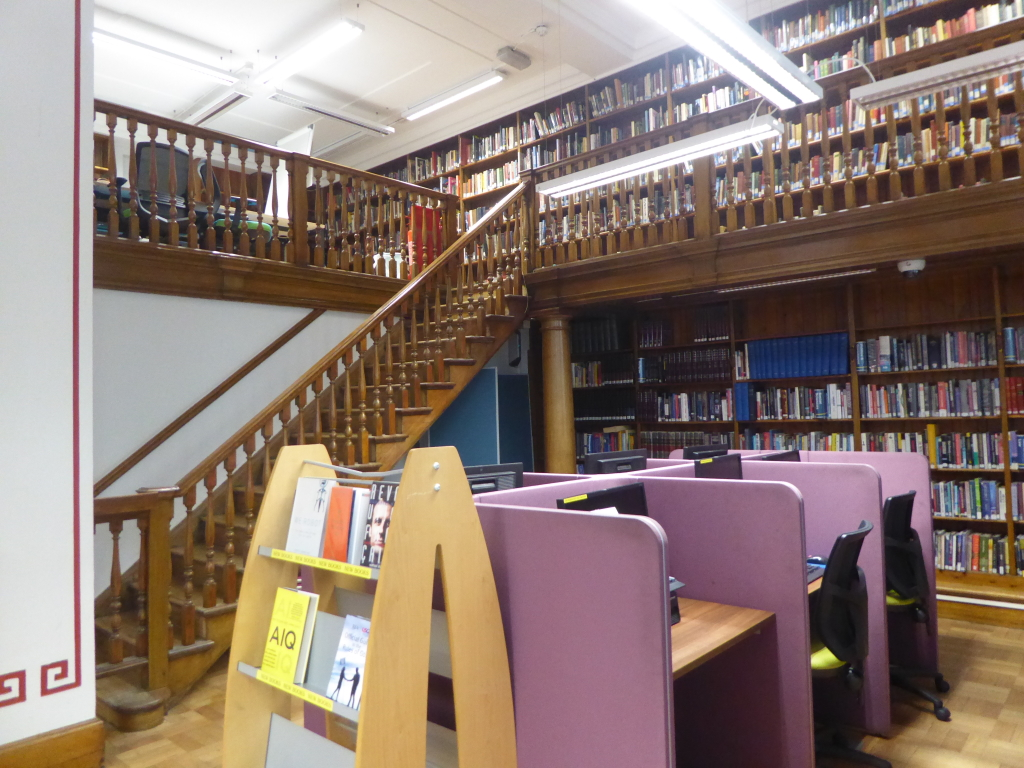
Interior of a reading room at West End Arts Library, 2019.
