= Tri-borough shared services =

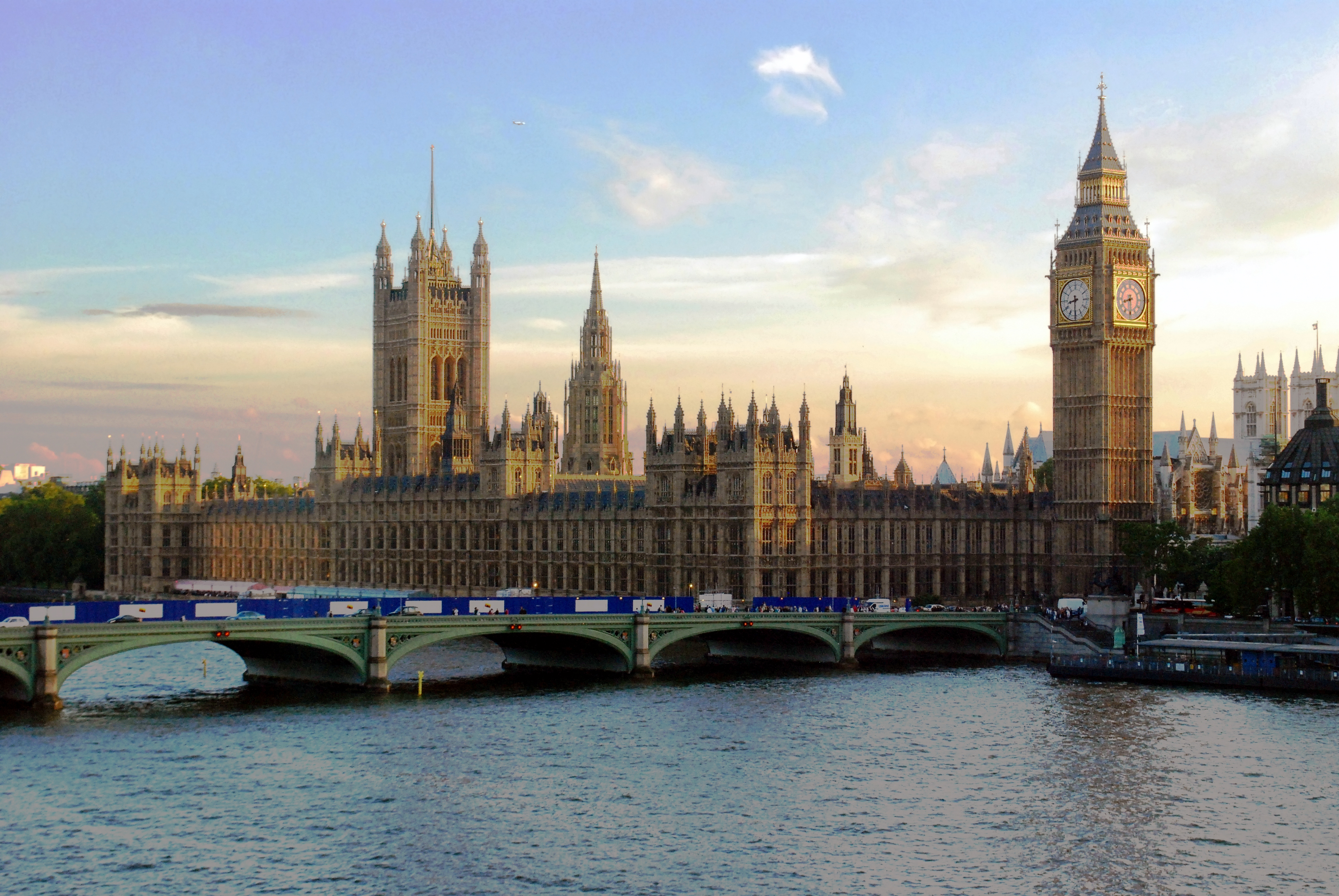
Westminster

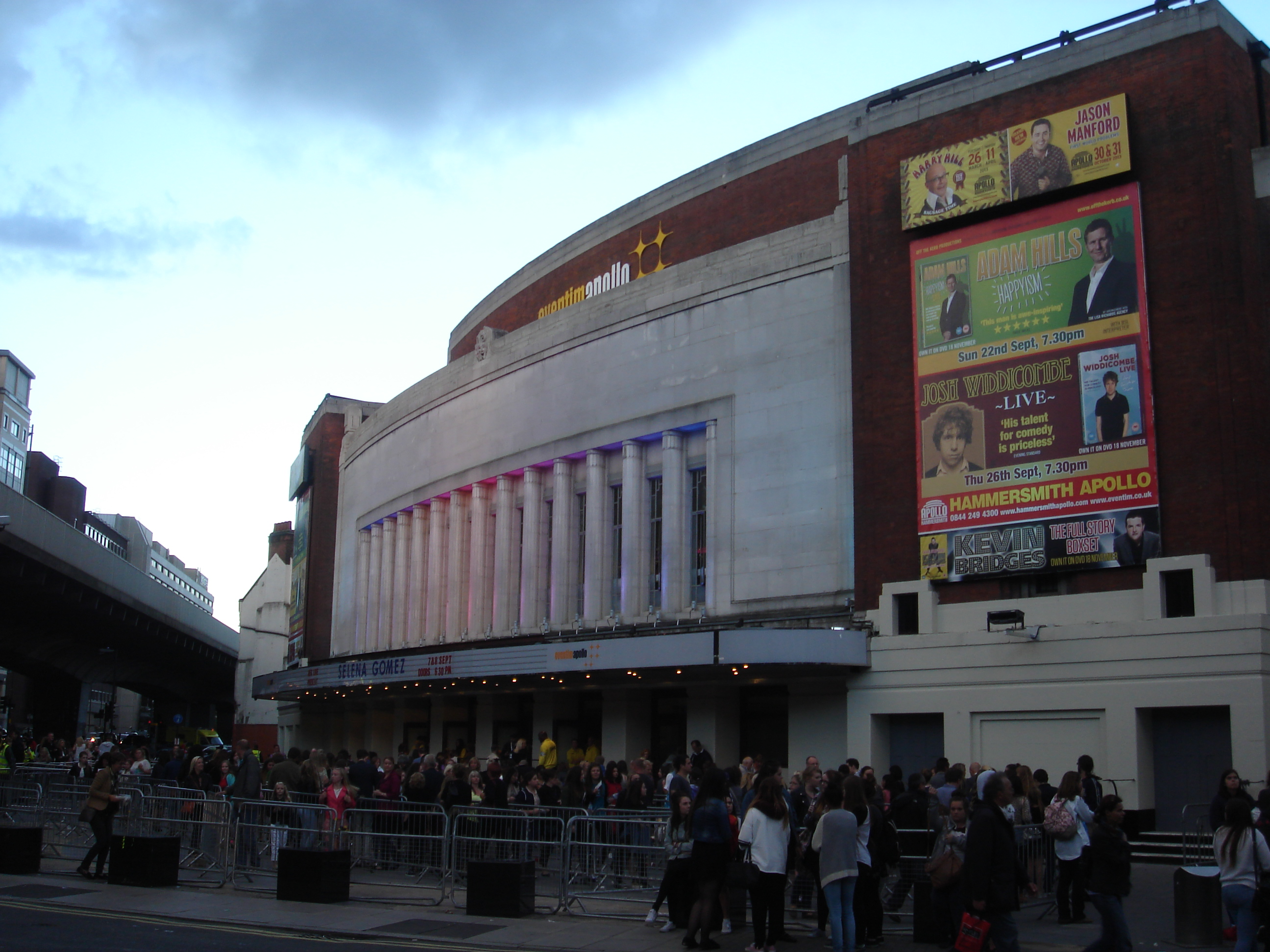
Hammersmith & Fulham

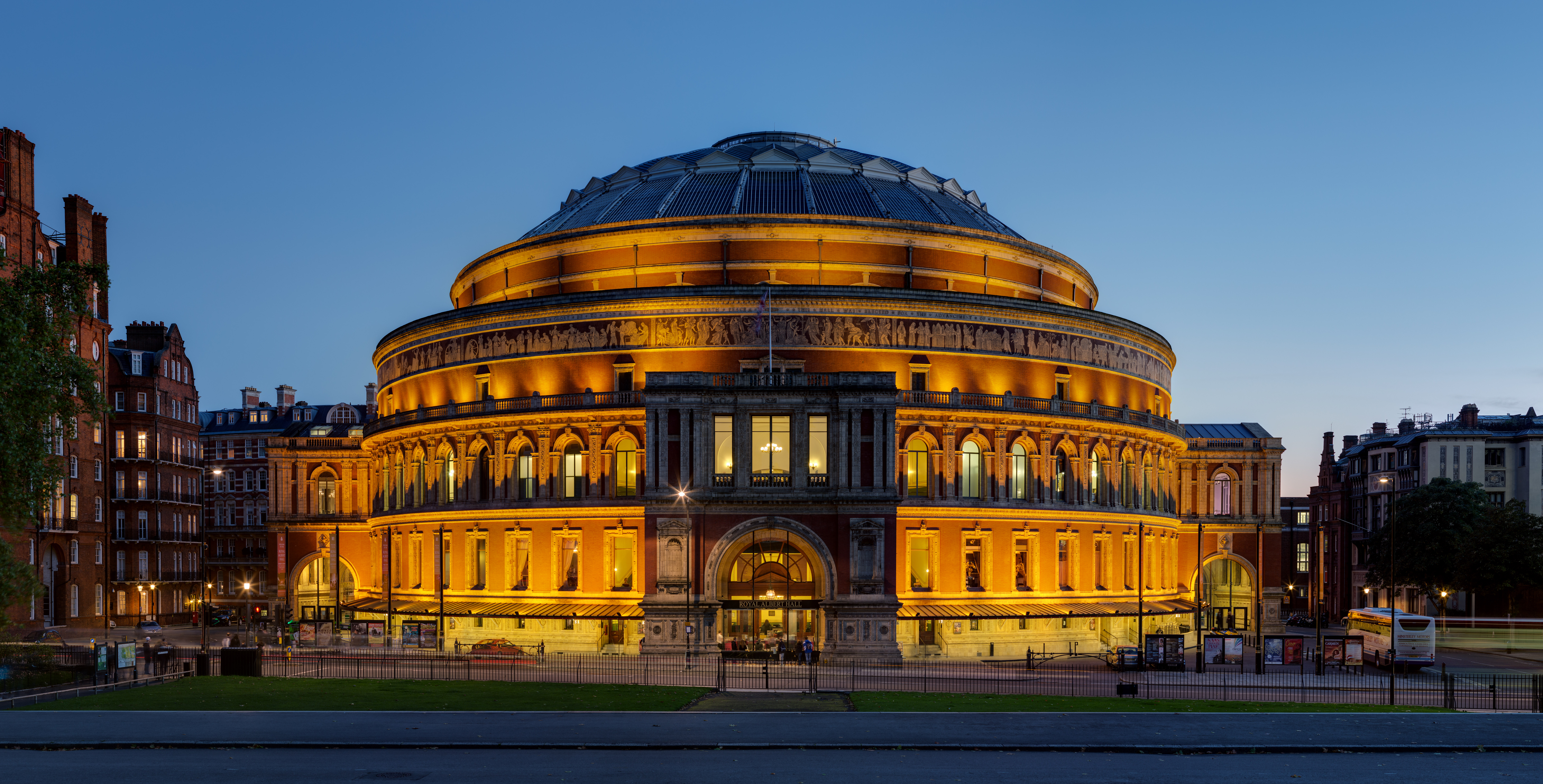
Kensington & Chelsea

Tri-borough is a project between three councils in west London, England to combine service provision. The councils are Westminster City Council, Hammersmith and Fulham London Borough Council and the Kensington and Chelsea London Borough Council. It launched in June 2011 and was due to come to an end in April 2018.

== Background ==
In October 2010, Westminster City Council, Hammersmith and Fulham London Borough Council, and Kensington and Chelsea London Borough Council planned to combining specific areas of service delivery as a response to financial pressures facing local government in England. In February 2011 the chief executives of the three local authorities published a report entitled Bold Ideas for Challenging Times. This set out the plan to share services, combine back office and management costs, and gave a projected saving of £33.4m. The report outlined that in June 2011, the three authorities would, together detail how they would deliver the proposals. The cabinets for each authority then met separately and agreed to implement the proposals to share services. Under the plan the councils would remain legally distinct entities responsible for service specification and delivery.

== Progress ==
Since June 2011 each council’s children’s service, adult social care and library service has been combined to create a single service. Each of these services is headed by a single executive director and a shared management team. Councillors from each council retain responsibility for the way the shared service is provided in their local area. Specific areas of corporate services have also been combined across the three councils. This has included creating a joint chief executive for Hammersmith and Fulham, and Kensington and Chelsea and a single treasury and pensions team. A shared environment and leisure team has also been created across Hammersmith and Fulham, and Kensington and Chelsea. Currently, environmental services are not a combined service due to contractual constraints for Westminster City Council. In total, tri-borough was reported to have saved £1m by October 2011 and is expected to achieve target savings of £33.4m by the financial year 2014/15. Additional savings of £7m are expected to be made by 2015/16.

== Reaction ==
The plan is supported by central government. David Cameron MP said: “I think this is a very important point and I hope that councils up and down the country will look at it. Three large councils are coming together and saving £33m because they are sharing back-office services, executive teams and so on. Frankly, if they can do it, as large councils that have big responsibilities, many other councils should be doing it in London and elsewhere. Until we see that happening, I do not think it is realistic to say that it is necessary for councils to cut front-line services”

== Split ==
On 27 March 2017 a statement was published by the three councils that they had reached an agreement to serve notice on the arrangement, citing uncertainty caused by Hammersmith and Fulham Borough Council.

Both Westminster City Council and Kensington and Chelsea London Borough Council are planning to continue sharing services in a bi-borough arrangement.

== See also ==
- Grenfell Tower
- Hammersmith and Fulham Borough Council
