= John Thorpe (disambiguation) =

John Thorpe (c. 1565–c. 1655) was an English architect.

John Thorpe or Thorp may also refer to:

- John Thorp (engineer) (1912–1992), American aeronautical engineer
- John Thorp (researcher) (1927–2017), New Zealand chemistry lecturer and trans pioneer
- John Thorpe (antiquarian, 1682–1750), English physician and antiquarian
- John Thorpe (antiquarian, 1715–1792), his son, English antiquarian
- John Thorp (colonial administrator) (1912–1961), Governor of Seychelles
- John Thorp (MP for Gloucestershire), MP for Gloucestershire
- John Thorpe (MP for Surrey), MP for Surrey
- John Thorp (physician) (born 1957/1958), American obstetrician and gynecologist
- John Thorpe (priest) (1855–1932), Archdeacon of Macclesfield, father of John Henry Thorpe
- John Thorp, son of Holden Thorp
- John A. Thorpe (born 1936), American mathematician
- John Henry Thorpe (1887–1944), British Conservative politician
- John M. Thorpe (1890–1956), American college football player and coach
- Jack Thorpe (1881–?), American football player
- John Thorpe, a character in Jane Austen's Northanger Abbey
