= Difference Equations: From Rabbits to Chaos =

2005 mathematics textbook

- Author: Paul Cull, Mary Flahive, and Robby Robson
- Series: Undergraduate Texts in Mathematics
- Subject: Difference equations
- Genre: Textbook
- Publisher: Springer-Verlag
- Publication date: 2005
- ISBN: 978-0-387-23233-1

Difference Equations: From Rabbits to Chaos is an undergraduate-level textbook on difference equations, a type of recurrence relation in which the values of a sequence are determined by equations involving differences of successive terms of the sequence. It was written by Paul Cull, Mary Flahive, and Robby Robson, and published by Springer-Verlag in their Undergraduate Texts in Mathematics series (Vol. 111, 2005, doi:10.1007/0-387-27645-9, ISBN 978-0-387-23233-1).

== Topics ==
After an introductory chapter on the Fibonacci numbers and the rabbit population dynamics example based on these numbers that Fibonacci introduced in his book Liber Abaci, the book includes chapters on homogeneous linear equations, finite difference equations and generating functions, nonnegative difference equations and roots of characteristic polynomials, the Leslie matrix in population dynamics, matrix difference equations and Markov chains, recurrences in modular arithmetic, algorithmic applications of fast Fourier transforms, and nonlinear difference equations and dynamical systems. Four appendices include a set of worked problems, background on complex numbers and linear algebra, and a method of Morris Marden for testing whether the sequence defined by a difference equation converges to zero.

== Reception and related reading ==
Other books on similar topics include A Treatise on the Calculus of Finite Differences by George Boole, Introduction to Difference Equations by S. Goldberg, Difference Equations: An Introduction with Applications by W. G. Kelley and A. C. Peterson, An Introduction to Difference Equations by S. Elaydi, Theory of Difference Equations: An Introduction by V. Lakshmikantham and D. Trigiante, and Difference Equations: Theory and Applications by R. E. Mickens. However, From Rabbits to Chaos places a greater emphasis on computation than theory compared to some of these other books. Reviewer Henry Ricardo writes that the book is "more suitable to an undergraduate course" than its alternatives, despite being less in-depth, because of its greater accessibility and connection to application areas. Similarly, reviewer Shandelle Henson calls From Rabbits to Chaos "well written and easy to read" but adds that it is not "comprehensive or up-to-date".
