= Peter Hilton =

British mathematician (1923–2010)

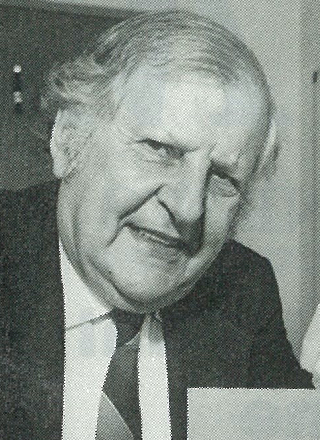
- Hilton in 1993
- Born: Peter John Hilton; 7 April 1923; London, England
- Died: 6 November 2010 (aged 87); Binghamton, New York, United States
- Education: The Queen's College, Oxford
- Known for: Eckmann–Hilton argument Eckmann–Hilton duality Hilton's theorem
- Spouse: Margaret Mostyn (m. 1949)
- Children: 2
- Scientific career
- Fields: Mathematician
- Workplaces: University of Birmingham; Cornell University; Case Western Reserve University; Binghamton University; University of Central Florida
- Thesis: Calculation of the homotopy groups of $A_n^2$-polyhedra (1949)
- Doctoral advisor: J. H. C. Whitehead
- Doctoral students: Paul Kainen

Peter John Hilton (7 April 1923 – 6 November 2010) was a British mathematician, noted for his contributions to homotopy theory and for code-breaking during World War II.

== Early life ==
He was born in Brondesbury, London, the son of Mortimer Jacob Hilton (1893–1959), a Jewish physician who was in general practice in Peckham, and his wife Elizabeth Amelia Freedman (1900–1984), and was brought up in Kilburn. The physiologist Sidney Montague Hilton (1921–2011) of the University of Birmingham Medical School was his elder brother.

Hilton was educated at St Paul's School, London. He went to The Queen's College, Oxford in 1940 to read mathematics, on an open scholarship, where the mathematics tutor was Ughtred Haslam-Jones.

== Bletchley Park ==
A wartime undergraduate at Oxford, on a shortened course, Hilton was obliged to train with the Royal Artillery, and faced scheduled conscription in summer 1942. After four terms, he took the advice of his tutor, and followed up a civil service recruitment contact. He had an interview for mathematicians with knowledge of German, and was offered a position in the Foreign Office without being told the nature of the work. The team was, in fact, recruiting on behalf of the Government Code and Cypher School. Aged 18, he arrived at the codebreaking station Bletchley Park on 12 January 1942.

Hilton worked with several of the Bletchley Park deciphering groups. He was initially assigned to Naval Enigma in Hut 8. Hilton commented on his experience working with Alan Turing, whom he knew well for the last 12 years of his life, in his "Reminiscences of Bletchley Park" from A Century of Mathematics in America:

It is a rare experience to meet an authentic genius. Those of us privileged to inhabit the world of scholarship are familiar with the intellectual stimulation furnished by talented colleagues. We can admire the ideas they share with us and are usually able to understand their source; we may even often believe that we ourselves could have created such concepts and originated such thoughts. However, the experience of sharing the intellectual life of a genius is entirely different; one realizes that one is in the presence of an intelligence, a sensibility of such profundity and originality that one is filled with wonder and excitement.

Hilton echoed similar thoughts in the Nova PBS documentary Decoding Nazi Secrets (UK Station X, Channel 4, 1999).

In late 1942, Hilton transferred to work on German teleprinter ciphers. A special section known as the "Testery" had been formed in July 1942 to work on one such cipher, codenamed "Tunny", and Hilton was one of the early members of the group. His role was to devise ways to deal with changes in Tunny, and to liaise with another section working on Tunny, the "Newmanry", which complemented the hand-methods of the Testery with specialised codebreaking machinery. Hilton has been counted as a member of the Newmanry, possibly on a part-time basis.

=== Recreational ===
A convivial pub drinker at Bletchley Park, Hilton also spent time with Turing working on chess problems and palindromes. He there constructed a 51-letter palindrome:

"Doc note, I dissent. A fast never prevents a fatness. I diet on cod."

== Mathematics ==
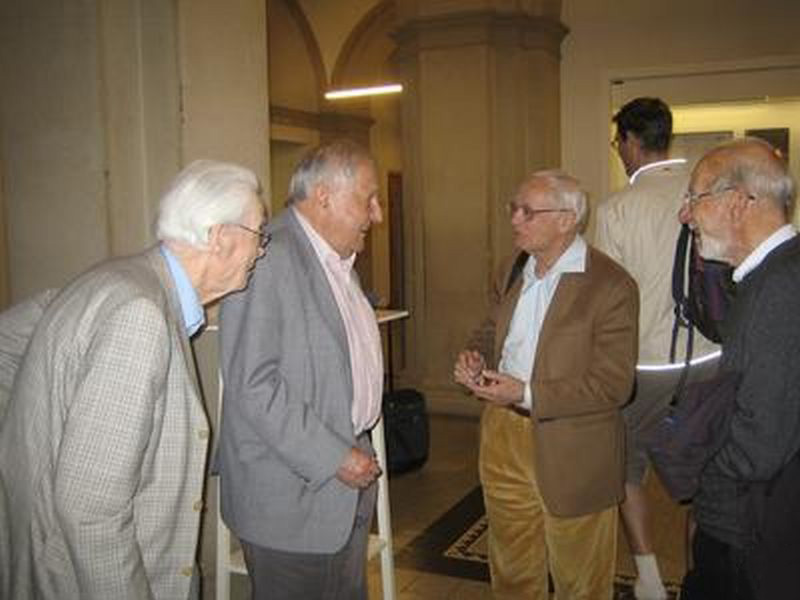
Beno Eckmann, Peter Hilton, Jean-Pierre Serre, and André Haefliger in Zürich in 2007

Hilton obtained his DPhil in 1949 from Oxford University under the supervision of John Henry Whitehead. His dissertation was "Calculation of the homotopy groups of $A_n^2$-polyhedra". His principal research interests were in algebraic topology, homological algebra, categorical algebra and mathematics education. He published 15 books and over 600 articles in these areas, some jointly with colleagues. Hilton's theorem (1955) is on the homotopy groups of a wedge of spheres. It addresses an issue that comes up in the theory of "homotopy operations".

Turing, at the Victoria University of Manchester, in 1948 invited Hilton to see the Manchester Mark 1 machine. Around 1950, Hilton took a position at the university maths department. He was there in 1949, when Turing engaged in a discussion that introduced him to the word problem for groups. Hilton worked with Walter Lederman. Another colleague there was Hugh Dowker, who in 1951 drew his attention to the Serre spectral sequence.

In 1952, Hilton moved to DPMMS in Cambridge, England, where he ran a topology seminar attended by John Frank Adams, Michael Atiyah, David B. A. Epstein, Terry Wall and Christopher Zeeman. Via Hilton, Atiyah became aware of Jean-Pierre Serre's coherent sheaf proof of the Riemann–Roch theorem for curves, and found his first research direction in sheaf methods for ruled surfaces.

In 1955, Hilton started work with Beno Eckmann on what became known as Eckmann-Hilton duality for the homotopy category. Through Eckmann, he became editor of the Ergebnisse der Mathematik und ihrer Grenzgebiete, a position he held from 1964 to 1983.

Hilton returned to Manchester as Professor, in 1956. In 1958, he became the Mason Professor of Pure Mathematics at the University of Birmingham. He moved to the United States in 1962 to be Professor of Mathematics at Cornell University, a post he held until 1971. From 1971 to 1973, he held a joint appointment as Fellow of the Battelle Seattle Research Center and Professor of Mathematics at the University of Washington. On 1 September 1972, he was appointed Louis D. Beaumont University Professor at Case Western Reserve University; on 1 September 1973, he took up the appointment. In 1982, he was appointed Distinguished Professor of Mathematics at Binghamton University, becoming Emeritus in 2003. Latterly, he spent each spring semester as Distinguished Professor of Mathematics at the University of Central Florida.

Hilton is featured in the book Mathematical People.

== Death and family ==
Peter Hilton died on 6 November 2010 in Binghamton, New York, at age 87. He left behind his wife, Margaret (born 1925), whom he married in 1949, and their two sons, who were adopted.

Margaret Hilton was a RADA-trained actress who appeared on Broadway in the shows A Day in the Death of Joe Egg (1985, Longacre Theatre) and Rose (1980, Cort Theatre). In 1978 she won the Actors Equity Association's award for the most promising actress on the New York stage, for her role in Molly. She also played television roles. She died in Seattle in 2020.

== In popular culture ==
Hilton is portrayed by actor Matthew Beard in the 2014 film The Imitation Game, which tells the tale of Alan Turing and the cracking of Nazi Germany's Enigma code.

== Academic positions ==
- Lecturer at University of Cambridge, 1952–55
- Senior Lecturer at University of Manchester, England, 1956–58
- Mason Professor of Pure Mathematics, University of Birmingham, England, 1958–62
- Visiting Professor at the Eidgenössische Technische Hochschule at Zürich, ETH Zurich, 1966–67, 1981–82, 1988–89
- Visiting Professor at the Courant Institute of Mathematical Sciences, New York University, 1967–68
- Visiting Professor at the Universitat Autònoma de Barcelona, Autonomous University of Barcelona, 1989
- Professeur invité, University of Lausanne, in 1996

== Honours ==
- Silver Medal, University of Helsinki, 1975
- Doctor of Humanities (hon. causa), N. University of Michigan, 1977
- Corresponding Member, Brazilian Academy of Sciences, 1979
- Doctor of Science (hon. causa), Memorial University of Newfoundland, 1983
- Doctor of Science (hon. causa), Autonomous University of Barcelona, 1989
- In August 1983, an international conference on algebraic topology was held, under the auspices of the Canadian Mathematical Society, to mark Hilton's 60th Birthday. Professor Hilton was presented with a Festschrift of papers dedicated to him (London Mathematical Society Lecture Notes, Volume 86, 1983). The American Mathematical Society has published the proceedings under the title ‘Conference on Algebraic Topology in Honor of Peter Hilton’
- Hilton was selected in October 1992, to deliver the invited lecture at the ‘Georges de Rham’ day at the University of Lausanne.
- An International Conference was held in Montreal in May 1993, to mark the 70th birthday of Hilton. The proceedings were published as The Hilton Symposium, CRM Proceedings and Lecture Notes, Volume 6, American Mathematical Society (1994), edited by Guido Mislin.
- In 1994, Hilton was the Mahler Lecturer of the Australian Mathematical Society.
- In the summers of 2001 and 2002, Hilton was Visiting Erskine Fellow at the University of Canterbury, Christchurch, New Zealand.
- In winter term of 2005 Hilton received an appointment as Courtesy Faculty in the College of Arts and Sciences at University of South Florida.

== Hilton's former PhD students ==
According to the Mathematics Genealogy Project site, Hilton supervised at least 27 doctoral students, including Paul Kainen at Cornell University.

== Bibliography ==
- Peter J. Hilton, An introduction to homotopy theory, Cambridge Tracts in Mathematics and Mathematical Physics, no. 43, Cambridge University Press, 1953. ISBN 0-521-05265-3 MR 0056289
- Peter J. Hilton, Shaun Wylie, Homology theory: An introduction to algebraic topology, Cambridge University Press, New York, 1960. ISBN 0-521-09422-4 MR 0115161
- Peter Hilton, Homotopy theory and duality, Gordon and Breach, New York-London-Paris, 1965 ISBN 0-677-00295-5 MR 0198466
- H.B. Griffiths and P.J. Hilton, "A Comprehensive Textbook of Classical Mathematics", Van Nostrand Reinhold, London, 1970, ISBN 978-0442028640
- Peter J. Hilton, Guido Mislin, Joe Roitberg, Localization of nilpotent groups and spaces, North-Holland Publishing Co., Amsterdam-Oxford, 1975. ISBN 0-444-10776-2 MR 0478146
- Peter Hilton, Jean Pedersen, Build your own polyhedra. Second edition, Dale Seymour Publications, Palo Alto, 1994. ISBN 0-201-49096-X
- Peter Hilton, Derek Holton, Jean Pedersen, Mathematical reflections: In a room with many mirrors. Corrected edition, Undergraduate Texts in Mathematics, Springer-Verlag, New York, 1996. ISBN 0-387-94770-1
- Peter J. Hilton, Urs Stammbach, A course in homological algebra. Second edition, Graduate Texts in Mathematics, vol 4, Springer-Verlag, New York, 1997. ISBN 0-387-94823-6 MR 1438546
- Hans Walser, 99 Points of Intersection, translated by Peter Hilton and Jean Pedersen, MAA Spectrum, Mathematical Association of America, 2006. ISBN 978-0-88385-553-9
- Peter Hilton, Derek Holton, Jean Pedersen, Mathematical vistas: From a room with many windows, Undergraduate Texts in Mathematics, Springer-Verlag, New York, 2010. ISBN 1-4419-2867-7
- Peter Hilton, Jean Pedersen, A mathematical tapestry: Demonstrating the beautiful unity of mathematics, Cambridge University Press, Cambridge, 2010. ISBN 0-521-12821-8
