= Laurence Holker Potts =

English inventor and physician

- Born: 18 April 1789; London
- Died: 23 March 1850 (aged 60)
- Occupations: Inventor and physician

Laurence Holker Potts (18 April 1789 – 23 March 1850) was an English inventor and physician.

== Biography ==
Potts son of Cuthbert Potts, surgeon, and Ethelinda Margaret Thorpe, daughter of John Thorpe, M.D., F.S.A. He was born in Pall Mall, London, on 18 April 1789. He was educated at Westminster School and at a school in Northamptonshire, and in 1805 he was apprenticed to Mr. Birch, surgeon, of Warwick. In 1810 he was entered at St. George's Hospital and became a house-pupil of Sir Benjamin Brodie; William Frederick Chambers and (Sir) Charles Locock were house-pupils at the same time. He passed the College of Surgeons in 1812, and graduated M.D. at Aberdeen in 1825. In 1812 he was appointed surgeon to the Royal Devon and Cornwall miners militia, then quartered in Ireland. The regiment returned to Truro in 1814, and was subsequently disbanded, Potts starting in practice in the town. He had always taken much interest in scientific pursuits, and in 1818 took an active part in founding the Royal Institution of Cornwall. He gave several courses of lectures there, and was in the habit of making gratuitous analyses of minerals for the miners. In 1828 he became superintendent and physician of the Cornwall county lunatic asylum at Bodmin. This appointment he resigned in 1837, removing in the following year to Vanbrugh Castle, Blackheath, where he established an institution for the treatment of spinal diseases. Here he established a workshop for the manufacture of the various appliances and apparatus, of which he devised many new forms. He had at the same time a town house in Buckingham Street, Strand, to which a workshop was attached. His increasing interest in his inventions diverted his attention from his patients, and Vanbrugh Castle was eventually given up.

In 1843 Potts took out a patent for conveying letters on a railway formed by suspending wires or light rods from distant points, making use of church towers, or any other lofty structures available. The patent includes a velocipede and a boat propelled by paddles worked by hand.

The invention with which his name is closely connected is for a method of sinking foundations, for which he obtained a patent in 1843 (No. 9975). It consists in the sinking of hollow piles of iron, open at the lower end and closed at the top by a cap. A partial vacuum being then formed within the tube by means of a pump, the shingle, sand, &c., are caused to flow up through the pile by the pressure of the atmosphere, the rush of water from below breaking up the soil and undermining the lower edges of the pile. The pile descends by its own gravity, assisted by the pressure of the air on its closed end, and when it is filled, the contents are discharged by a pump. As the tube descends the cap is removed and a fresh length attached. The tubes may be of large size, when they practically become coffer-dams. The invention was well received, and at first it promised to be a great success. Potts gave evidence on 10 June 1844 before the royal commission on harbours of refuge (cf. Report, p. 119), when Mr. James Walker, president of the Institution of Civil Engineers, and a member of the commission, spoke very highly of the new method. The matter was taken up by the Trinity Board, and on 16 July 1845 an experimental tube, two feet six inches diameter, was driven to a depth of twenty-two feet into the Goodwin Sands in two or three hours. This was intended to form the foundation of a beacon, which, however, does not seem to have been completed until 26 August 1847, when it was announced to mariners (Mechanics' Magazine, 9 August 1845, p. 96; Civil Engineers' and Architects' Journal, December 1847, p. 388). Several small beacons were erected on sands lying near the mouth of the Thames in 1845–6 (cf. Findlay's paper in Transactions of the Society of Arts, 15 December 1847, lvi. 269).

In 1845 Potts became acquainted with Charles Fox of the firm of Fox & Henderson, who spent a considerable sum of money upon the invention, and used it wherever they had an opportunity (Proceedings of the Institution of Civil Engineers, xxvii. 301). The first large work upon which it was employed was the viaduct which carries the Chester and Holyhead railway across Maeldreath Bay in the Isle of Anglesey. Nineteen tubes, one foot diameter and sixteen feet long, were successfully sunk in the sand during the summer of 1846. A full account of this undertaking, with engravings, is given in the ‘Civil Engineers' and Architects' Journal,’ (December 1847, p. 388). It was also employed successfully for sinking the piers for a railway bridge over the Ouse at Huntingdon, but it failed at the bridge over the Nen at Peterborough, in consequence of the presence of boulders in the clay forming the river-bed. The foundations for the South-Western railway bridge over the Thames, between Datchet and Windsor, were laid by Potts's method; but on 12 August 1849, when the line was ready to be opened, one of the tubes suddenly sank, causing a fracture in the girder resting upon it (Times, 14 Aug. 1849, p. 3). G. W. Hemans tried it with cylinders ten feet diameter in 1850, during the construction of a bridge over the Shannon at Athlone, on the Midland Great Western railway of Ireland, but the expense of pumping out the air was very considerable, and much trouble was caused by boulders, which the trial borings had failed to indicate (cf. Proceedings of the Institution of Civil Engineers, xxi. 265, xxvii. 301, 305, xxviii. 349, 353, l. 131; Humber, Bridges, 3rd edit. pp. 180, 247; Civil Engineers' and Architects' Journal, December 1850, p. 392; Burnell's Supplement to Weale's Theory of Bridges, 1850, p. 100).

Potts read a paper on his method before the Society of Arts on 10 May 1848, for which he received the Isis gold medal (Transactions, lvi. 441). He devoted the last years of his life almost exclusively to the perfecting of his invention, upon which he expended a very considerable fortune. Unhappily, it was not a financial success; and experience has proved that its application is very limited. It is rarely used now (cf. Newman, Cylinder Bridge Piers, 1893, p. 41). It had, however, one very important result, as it incidentally gave rise to the system of sinking foundations by compressed air, an invention of great importance. It was intended to employ Potts's method to sink the piers of Rochester Bridge (commenced about 1849), but it was found that the river-bed was encumbered with the remains of a very ancient bridge, and that the cylinders could not be forced through the obstructions. It then occurred to Mr. J. Hughes, the engineer in charge of the work, to reverse the process, and to pump air into the cylinders to force the water out, so that the men could work at the bottom of the cylinders, as in a diving-bell. As the material was excavated from the space covered by the cylinders they sank by their own weight. An ‘air-lock’ provided the means of ingress and egress to the cylinders. An account of the work was read by Hughes before the Institution of Civil Engineers in 1851 (cf. Proceedings, x. 353, also published separately). It was afterwards pointed out that the same method had been previously used in France, though on a very small scale.

Potts died on 23 March 1850. He married, in 1820, Miss Anne Wright, of Lambessow, Cornwall. Four daughters and two sons, John Thorpe and Benjamin L. F., both of whom were trained as engineers at the London Works, Smethwick, near Birmingham, under Fox & Henderson, survived him.
