= Desharnais (surname) =

Desharnais is a surname. Notable people with the surname include:

- David Desharnais (born 1986), Canadian ice hockey centre
- Robert Desharnais, American evolutionary biologist
- Vincent Desharnais (born 1996), Canadian ice hockey defenceman
