= Geometric drawing =

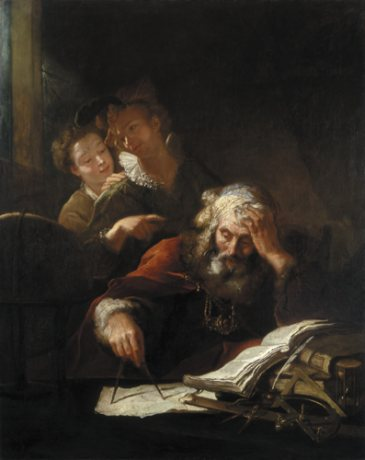
Geometric drawing made with ruler and compass

Geometric drawing consists of a set of processes for constructing geometric shapes and solving problems with the use of a ruler without graduation and the compass (drawing tool). Modernly, such studies can be done with the aid of software, which simulates the strokes performed by these instruments.

For ancient mathematicians, geometry could not do without the methods of geometric constructions, necessary for understanding, theoretical enrichment, and problem-solving.

The accuracy and precision required of geometric drawing make it an important ally in the application of geometric concepts in significant areas of human knowledge, such as architecture, engineering, industrial design, among others.

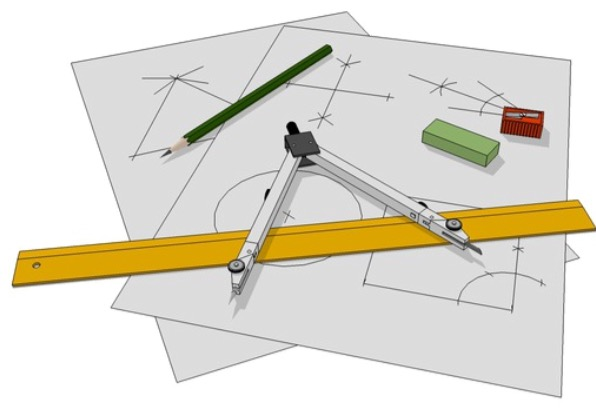
Ruler and compass

The process of geometric drawing is based on constructions with a ruler and compass, which in turn are based on the first three postulates of Euclid's Elements.

The historical importance of rulers and compasses as instruments in solving geometric problems leads many authors to limit Geometric Drawing to the representation and solution of geometric figures in the plane.

With the development of computer-aided design (CAD) programs, geometric drawing has become more important in teaching-learning processes (development of spatial faculties) than the more imprecise tracing offered by rulers and compasses, when taking into account the precision of computer systems.

== See also ==
- Graphic design
- Technical drawing
- Geometric Constructions

== General references ==
- Braga, Theodoro (1997). Desenho linear geométrico (in Portuguese). São Paulo: Cone.
- Carvalho, Benjamin (1982). Desenho Geométrico (in Portuguese). São Paulo: Ao Livro Técnico.
- Marmo, Carlos (1995). Desenho Geométrico (in Portuguese). São Paulo: Scipione.
- Putnoki, Jota (1990). Elementos de geometria e desenho geométrico (in Portuguese). Vol. 1 and 2. São Paulo: Scipione.
- Aaboe, Asger (2002). Episódios da História Antiga da Matemática (in Portuguese). Sociedade Brasileira de Matemática. ISBN 85-85818-07-7.
- Martin, George E (December 1997). Geometric Constructions. EUA: Springer. ISBN 0-387-98276-0.
- Boyer, Carl B (1976). História da Matemática (in Portuguese) (2nd ed.). São Paulo: Edgard Blücher. ISBN 85-212-0023-4.
