= 99 Points of Intersection =

2004 geometry book

- First edition (German)
- Author: Hans Walser
- Original title: 99 Schnittpunkte
- Translators: Peter Hilton; Jean Pedersen
- Language: German
- Subject: Euclidean plane geometry
- Publisher: Eagle / Ed. am Gutenbergplatz; Mathematical Association of America
- Publication date: 2004, 2006

99 Points of Intersection: Examples—Pictures—Proofs is a book on constructions in Euclidean plane geometry in which three or more lines or curves meet in a single point of intersection. This book was originally written in German by Hans Walser as 99 Schnittpunkte (Eagle / Ed. am Gutenbergplatz, 2004), translated into English by Peter Hilton and Jean Pedersen, and published by the Mathematical Association of America in 2006 in their MAA Spectrum series (ISBN 978-0-88385-553-9).

== Topics and organization ==
The book is organized into three sections. The first section provides introductory material, describing different mathematical situations in which multiple curves might meet, and providing different possible explanations for this phenomenon, including symmetry, geometric transformations, and membership of the curves in a pencil of curves. The second section shows the 99 points of intersection of the title. Each is given on its own page, as a large figure with three smaller figures showing its construction, with a one-line caption but no explanatory text. The third section provides background material and proofs for some of these points of intersection, as well as extending and generalizing some of these results.

Some of these points of intersection are standard; for instance, these include the construction of the centroid of a triangle as the point where its three median lines meet, the construction of the orthocenter as the point where the three altitudes meet, and the construction of the circumcenter as the point where the three perpendicular bisectors of the sides meet, as well as two versions of Ceva's theorem. However, others are new to this book, and include intersections related to silver rectangles, tangent circles, the Pythagorean theorem, and the nine-point hyperbola.

== Audience ==
John Jensen writes that "the clear and uncluttered illustrations of intersection make for a rich source for geometric investigation by high school geometry students". Jensen suggests that its examples would make a good complement to coursework both in exploratory geometry using interactive geometry software and in a geometry course focused on the formal proof of geometry propositions. He adds that the book itself is a proof of the possibility of presenting geometry without detailed explanations, and of introducing students to the beauty of the subject. Conversely, Gerry Leversha (writing in The Mathematical Gazette) calls the book "eccentric" and states that it "is clearly nothing to do with any syllabus anywhere".
