= Hilton's theorem =

On the loop space of a wedge of spheres

In algebraic topology, Hilton's theorem, proved by Peter Hilton (1955), states that the loop space of a wedge of spheres is homotopy-equivalent to a product of loop spaces of spheres.

John Milnor (1972) showed more generally that the loop space of the suspension of a wedge of spaces can be written as an infinite product of loop spaces of suspensions of smash products.

== Explicit Statements ==
One version of the Hilton-Milnor theorem states that there is a homotopy-equivalence

$\Omega(\Sigma X \vee \Sigma Y) \simeq \Omega \Sigma X \times \Omega \Sigma Y \times \Omega \Sigma \left( \bigvee_{i,j \geq 1} X^{\wedge i} \wedge Y^{\wedge j} \right).$

Here the capital sigma indicates the suspension of a pointed space.

== Example ==
Consider computing the fourth homotopy group of $S^2 \vee S^2$. To put this space in the language of the above formula, we are interested in

$\Omega (S^2 \vee S^2) \simeq \Omega ( \Sigma S^1 \vee \Sigma S^1)$.

One application of the above formula states

$\Omega (S^2 \vee S^2) \simeq \Omega S^2 \times \Omega S^2 \times \Omega \Sigma \left( \bigvee_{i,j \geq 1} S^{i+j} \right)$.

From this one can see that inductively we can continue applying this formula to get a product of spaces (each being a loop space of a sphere), of which only finitely many will have a non-trivial third homotopy group. Those factors are: $\Omega S^2, \Omega S^2, \Omega S^3, \Omega S^4, \Omega S^4$, giving the result

$\pi_4(S^2 \vee S^2) \simeq \oplus_2 \pi_4 S^2 \oplus \pi_4 S^3 \oplus \oplus_2 \pi_4 S^4 \simeq \oplus_3 \mathbb Z_2 \oplus \mathbb Z^2$,

i.e. the direct-sum of a free abelian group of rank two with the abelian 2-torsion group with 8 elements.
