= Mary Flahive =

Professor of mathematics

Mary Elizabeth Flahive (born 1948) is a professor of mathematics at Oregon State University. Her research interests are in number theory; she is the author of two books on difference equations and Diophantine approximation, and is also interested in the geometry of numbers and algebraic coding theory.

== Education ==
Flahive graduated from St. Joseph's College in New York in 1969. She completed her Ph.D. at the Ohio State University in 1976. Her dissertation, On The Minima Of Indefinite Binary Quadratic Forms, was supervised by Alan C. Woods, and cites the mentorship of another Ohio State mathematician, Jill Yaqub. (Although the Mathematics Genealogy Project also lists Bohuslav Diviš as an advisor, this is not reflected in her dissertation, where Diviš is only listed as a committee member.) She published it under the name Mary Flahive Gbur, and some of her journal papers from this period use the name Mary E. Gbur.

== Books ==
Flahive is co-author of the book The Markoff and Lagrange Spectra, on topics related to Diophantine approximation (with Thomas W. Cusick, Mathematical Surveys and Monographs 30, American Mathematical Society, 1989). She is also co-author of an undergraduate textbook on difference equations, Difference Equations: From Rabbits to Chaos (with Paul Cull and Robby Robson, Undergraduate Texts in Mathematics, Springer, 2005).

== Activism ==
Flahive has also been active in the promotion of women in mathematics. She served a five-year term on the Joint Committee On Women In the Mathematical Sciences from 1996 to 2000. With Marie A. Vitulli, she wrote an influential study on patterns of job offers to women with new U.S. Ph.D.s in 1997, and updated the study in 2010. The major differences that both studies found were that, at academic institutions whose highest degree in mathematics is a bachelor's degree, women were initially employed at a substantially higher rate than men, and in business and industry men were initially employed at a considerably higher rate than women. Their study found small differences in hiring at doctorate-granting institutions between men and women, indicating that other points in the career are more critical in explaining the gender gap between men and women in mathematics.
