= John Thorp (researcher) =

New Zealand chemistry researcher, lecturer, and author

- Born: 1927; England
- Died: 23 March 2017 (aged 90); Morrinsville, New Zealand
- Education: University of London
- Scientific career
- Workplaces: Guy's Hospital Medical School; University of Auckland; DSIR

John Martin Thorp (1927 – 23 March 2017) was a New Zealand chemistry researcher, university lecturer, and the author of several books, including two autobiographies on his life as a trans man. Much of his research work was on tribology, the study of friction, wear and lubrication.

== Early life, education, and transition ==
Born in 1927 in the United Kingdom, Thorp was educated at University of London, graduating with a BSc(Hons) in 1949 and PhD in 1951 with the title Preparation and adsorption properties of silica gels. He then lectured in inorganic and physical chemistry at Guy's Hospital Medical School, London. With the support of his friend (and future wife) Joan, who saved him from suicide, Thorp began his transition in the late 1950s with illegal and risky surgeries, and legally changed his name to John Martin in 1960.

== Move to New Zealand ==
In 1960 Thorp and his first wife, Joan, moved to New Zealand to escape intense media scrutiny and to take up a position as a chemistry lecturer at University of Auckland. The media scrutiny continued in New Zealand after being outed by The New Zealand Herald.

After several years of work in Auckland, Thorp was well-regarded as a scientist and in 1969 moved to Department of Scientific and Industrial Research (New Zealand) (DSIR), where he remained until Joan developed heart problems in 1982. He then retired to spend more time together, living in Coromandel Peninsula until her death in 1989.

== Later life ==
In 1995 Thorp met his second wife, Hazel, with whom he ran a bed and breakfast in Coromandel before moving to Thames in 2000.

On 23rd March 2017 the car driven by Thorp was struck by a train on a level crossing near Morrinsville while driving home from Waikato Hospital. He died immediately, but his wife Hazel walked away and was taken to Waikato Hospital.

== Selected works ==
- Thorp, JM. 1951 Preparation and adsorption properties of silica gels.
- King, RJ, Thorp, JM. 1978. Electromagnetic forming DSIR
- Thorp, JM. 2006. 1982 DSIR's Tribology Service : the first decade / DSIR
- Thorp, JM. 2006. A Change for Good. Auckland, NZ: Cape Catley
- Thorp, JM. 2010. Second Chance. Auckland, NZ: Heather Mackay
