= Duke of Kent School =

Independent school in Ewhurst, Surrey, England

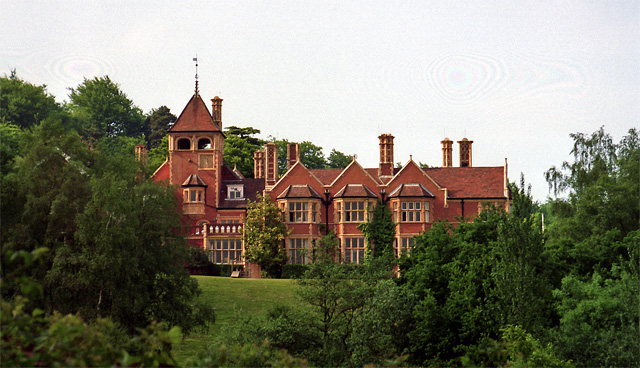
- Woolpit House, Duke of Kent School

Location
- Peaslake Road; Ewhurst, Surrey, GU6 7NS; England; 51°10′33″N 0°26′47″W

Information
- Type: Independent school
- Established: 1920
- Local authority: Surrey County Council
- Department for Education URN: 125336 Tables
- Head teacher: Sue Knox
- Gender: Coeducational
- Age range: 3–16
- Enrolment: 301 (2019)
- Capacity: 325
- Houses: Buzzard, Kestrel, Peregrine, Hawk
- Colours: Navy blue, white
- Website: www.dukeofkentschool.org.uk

Listed Building – Grade II
- Official name: Duke of Kent School
- Designated: 28 September 1987
- Reference no.: 1044340

Duke of Kent School is a coeducational, independent school for pupils aged 3–16 in Ewhurst, Surrey, England. It was formed in 1976 through the merger of Vanbrugh Castle School, Greenwich, and Woolpit School, Ewhurst. Originally a boarding school, it has educated day pupils only since 2014. It is named for Prince Edward, Duke of Kent.

== History ==
Woolpit House was built in 1885 for Henry Doulton, the businessman responsible for developing the ceramics manufacturing firm, Royal Doulton. The Grade II-listed building near Ewhurst, Surrey, was designed by Ernest George and Harold Peto. St Thomas of Canterbury School was opened at Woolpit House in 1949 and, by October 1951, pupil numbers had grown to more than 70. Vanbrugh Castle School was founded in 1920 at Vanbrugh Castle, Greenwich, for the sons of Royal Air Force staff who had been killed in service.

The two schools merged on the Ewhurst site in 1976, adopting the name "Duke of Kent School" in honour of Prince Edward, Duke of Kent. Initially a boys-only boarding school, it became co-educational two years later. In 1995, there were around 100 boys (of whom 60 were boarders) and 60 girls (of whom 50 were boarders) between the ages of 4 and 13 attending the school. GCSE courses were first taught in October 2008 and the first cohort of Year 11 pupils left the school in the summer of 2011. Since September 2014, the Duke of Kent School has operated solely as a day school with no boarders.

The boarding provision was last inspected by Ofsted in 2011, when the judgement was "Good". The school is inspected by the Independent Schools Inspectorate. As of 2019, the most recent inspection was in 2017 and found that educational quality was excellent.
