= Shandelle Henson =

American mathematician

Shandelle Marie Henson
- Born: 1964 (age 61–62)
- Education: Southern Adventist University; Duke University; University of Tennessee
- Scientific career
- Fields: Mathematics
- Workplaces: College of William & Mary; Andrews University

Shandelle Marie Henson (born 1964) is an American mathematician and mathematical biologist known for her work in population dynamics. She is a professor of mathematics and ecology at Andrews University in Berrien Springs, Michigan, and the editor-in-chief of the journal Natural Resource Modeling.

== Education and career ==
Henson was an undergraduate at Southern College (now Southern Adventist University), and a visiting student at Harvard University, graduating from Southern College in 1987 with a bachelor's degree in mathematics, summa cum laude, as one of the college's five Southern Scholars for that year. She studied mathematical logic at Duke University, earning a master's degree in 1989, and completed a Ph.D. in 1994 at the University of Tennessee. Her dissertation, Individual-based Physiologically Structured Population and Community Models, was on partial differential equations in population dynamics, and was supervised by Thomas G. Hallam.

After postdoctoral research as Hanno Rund Visiting Assistant Professor at the University of Arizona, Henson joined the faculty at the College of William & Mary in 1999, and moved to Andrews University in 2001. There, she was promoted to full professor in 2006, chaired the mathematics department from 2011 to 2016, and added a second affiliation as a professor of ecology in the department of biology in 2016.

== Books ==
Henson is the co-author, with J. M. Cushing, R. F. Costantino, Brian Dennis, and Robert Desharnais, of the book Chaos in Ecology: Experimental Nonlinear Dynamics (Academic Press, 2003). She is also the author of a biography of Sam Campbell, titled Sam Campbell: Philosopher of the Forest (Three Lakes Historical Society and TEACH Services, 2001).

== Recognition ==
In 2007, Southern Adventist University gave Henson their alumnus of the year award.
