= L. Christine Kinsey =

American mathematician

- Title: Professor of Mathematics

Academic background
- Education: University of Maryland
- Thesis: Pseudoisotopies and Submersions of a Compact Manifold to the Circle (1984)
- Doctoral advisor: Walter Neumann

Academic work
- Discipline: Mathematics
- Sub-discipline: Topology

Laura Christine Kinsey is an American mathematician specializing in topology. She is a professor of mathematics at Canisius College.

== Education ==
Kinsey graduated from the University of Maryland, College Park in 1975 with honors in mathematics. She returned to the University of Maryland for graduate study, completing a Ph.D. there in 1984. Her dissertation, Pseudoisotopies and Submersions of a Compact Manifold to the Circle, was jointly supervised by Henry C. King and Walter Neumann.

== Books ==
Kinsey is the author of mathematics textbooks that include:

- Topology of Surfaces (Undergraduate Texts in Mathematics, Springer, 1993)
- Symmetry, Shape, and Space: An Introduction to Mathematics through Geometry (with Teresa Moore, Springer, 2002)
- Geometry and Symmetry (with Teresa Moore and Efstratios Prassidis, Wiley, 2010)
