= Vanbrugh Castle =

Grade I listed house in Royal Borough of Greenwich, UK

Coordinates: 51.4803°N 0.0048°E

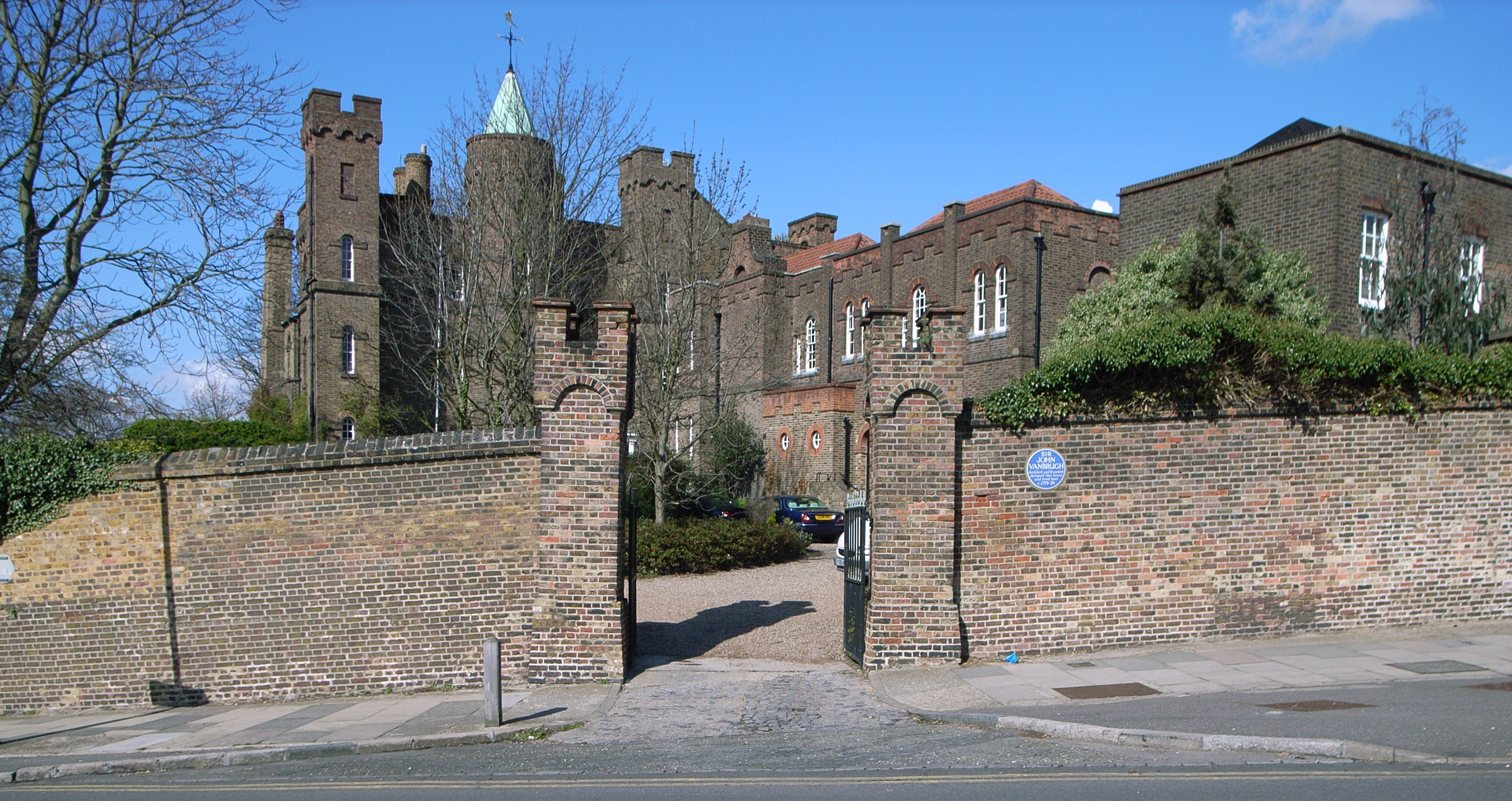
Vanbrugh Castle

Vanbrugh Castle is a house designed and built by John Vanbrugh around 1719 as a residence for his family.

It is located on Maze Hill on the eastern edge of Greenwich Park in London, to the north of Blackheath, with views to the west past the Old Royal Naval College at Greenwich down to the Thames reaching as far as the Houses of Parliament.

Between 1920 and 1976, it was the site of a school that was funded by the RAF Benevolent Fund for the sons of RAF officers who had been killed in action, and that included several notable musicians amongst its staff during the 1950s.

== History ==
=== Years as a private residence ===
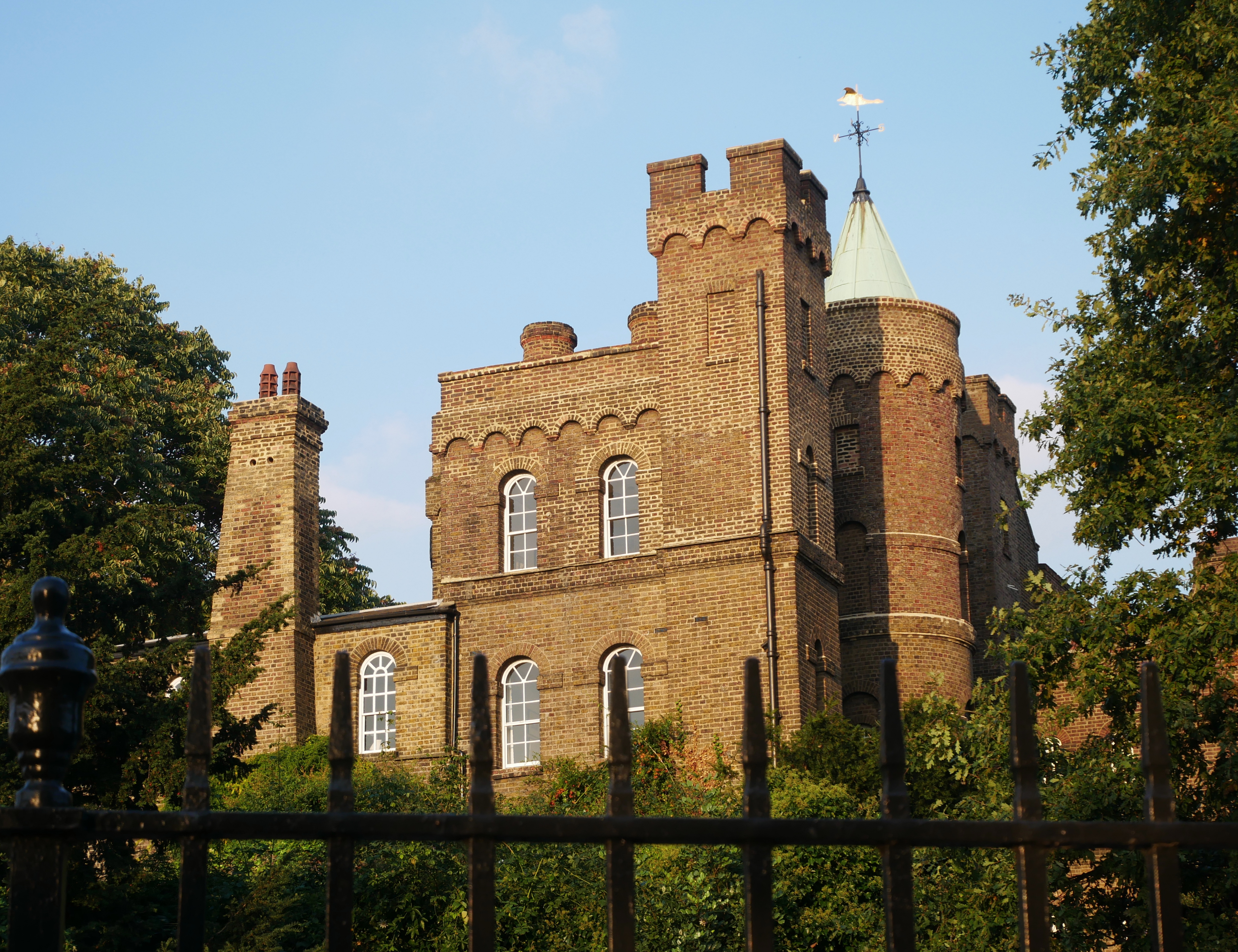
The west face of Vanbrugh Castle, as seen from the adjacent Greenwich Park

The castle was designed and built after Vanbrugh had been the architect of the baroque houses at Castle Howard and Blenheim Palace, and shortly after Vanbrugh succeeded his architectural mentor Christopher Wren as Surveyor to the Royal Naval Hospital in 1716. Vanbrugh took a lease of a 12-acre triangular site of the Westcombe estate from Sir Michael Biddulph, 2nd Baronet in 1718, now known as Vanbrugh Fields.

In contrast to the baroque style used for his professional commissions, he chose a more medieval, almost gothic, style for his own house. Built on the southwestern corner of the triangular site, it predates the first clearly Gothic Revival house at Strawberry Hill by 30 years. The main structure was finished in 1719, a three-storey square keep with basement built in brick with tall narrow windows, augmented on the south side square by three four-storey towers: two square flanking towers with battlements and a central projecting circular tower enclosing stairs capped by a conical copper roof. An arched corbel table below the moulded parapet is a feature unique to Vanbrugh at this date, also found at Kings Weston House (1710–1725). The building's narrow sash windows echo medieval arrowslits or lancets. A garden on the building's lead roof makes the most of the views over the Thames and London.

Aged 55, Vanbrugh married the 26-year-old Henrietta Maria Yarborough in York in January 1719, and he soon added a wing to the east side of the house in a similar style, creating a lopsided, asymmetric construction – said to be the first asymmetric house built in Europe since the Renaissance. It has the "castle air" adopted in Vanbrugh's remodelling of Kimbolton Castle (1708–1719), and also used at Shirburn Castle, both early revivals of a medieval style of architecture.

It has been claimed that the design was based on the Bastille, where Vanbrugh had been imprisoned for over four years in his youth, and the building may have been referred to as Bastille House before it became better known as Vanbrugh Castle. Visitors from Greenwich would pass by other structures in the grounds designed and built by Vanbrugh – the Nunnery, a second smaller single-story house occupied by Vanbrugh's brother Philip; Mince-pie House or Vanbrugh House, occupied by his brother Charles; and later added two white towers made from patented white bricks, perhaps for his two sons – before reaching a crenelated gateway, with a second gatehouse on the Dover road to the south.

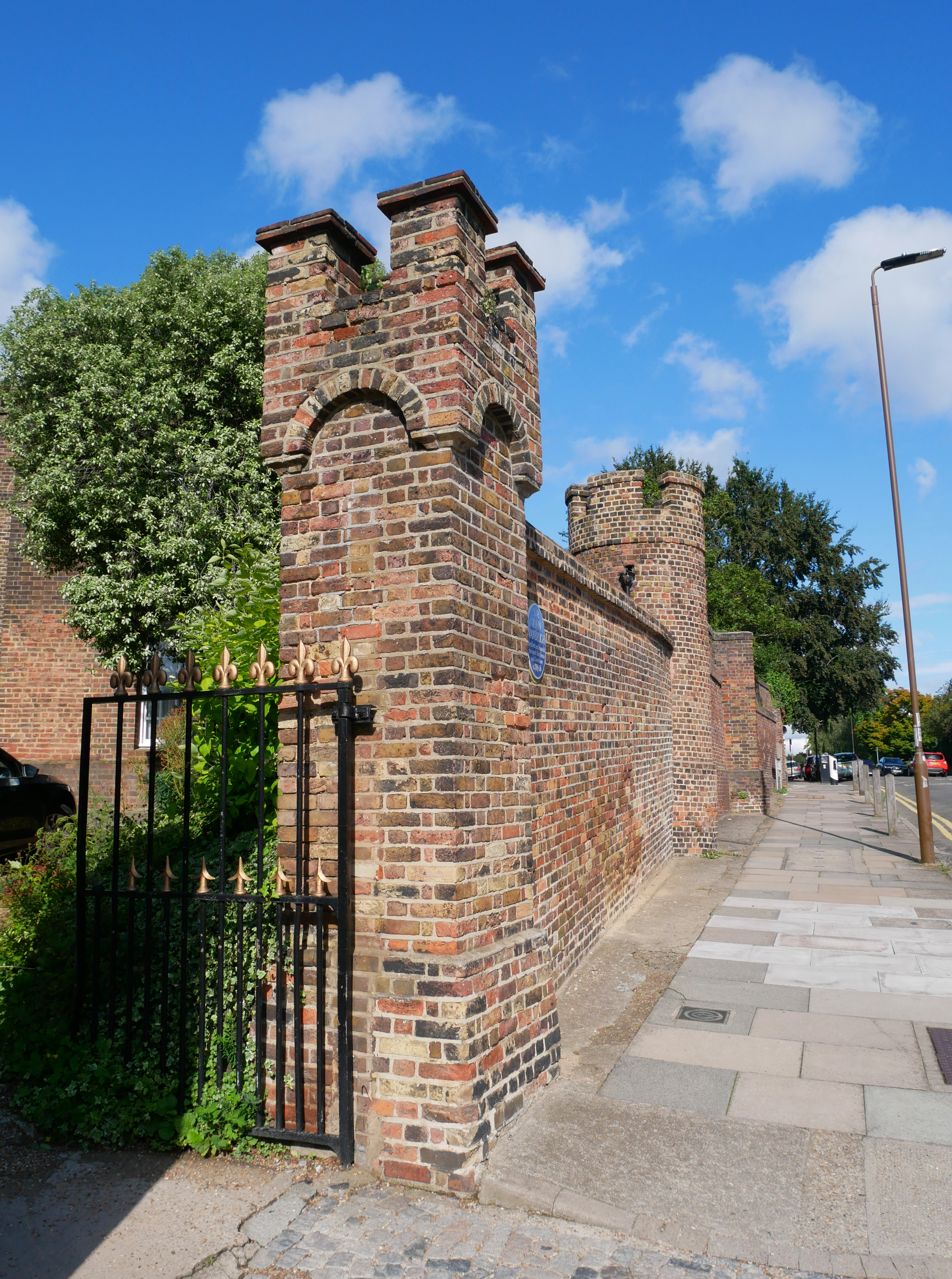
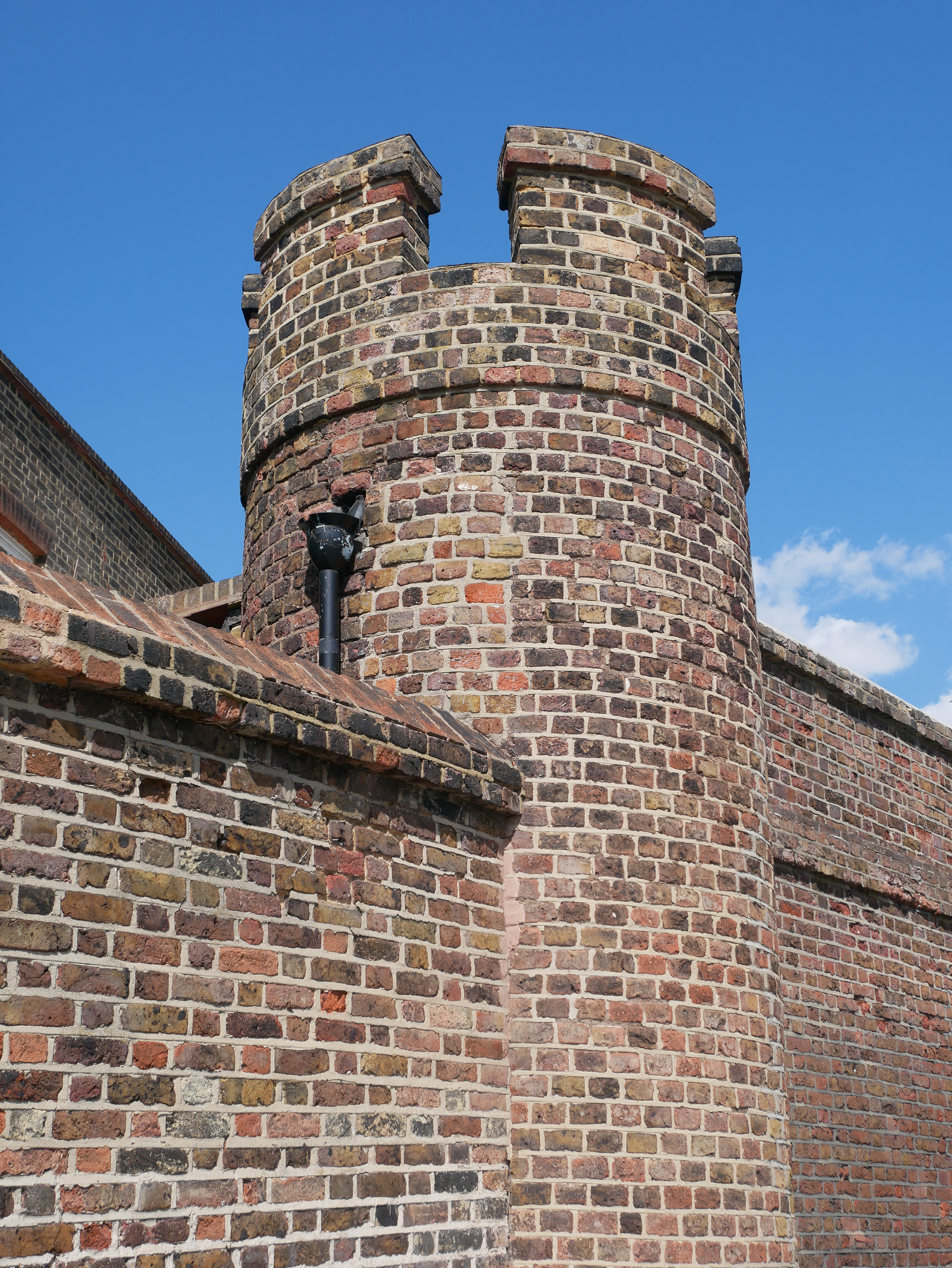
The Grade II listed gates to Vanbrugh Castle

=== Later history ===
The house passed through various owners after Vanbrugh's death in 1726. The next owner was Robert Holford (1686–1753) with his wife Sarah (née Vanderput). The novelist Mary Anna Needell, née Lupton, was born there in 1830. Further extensions to the main house were added in the late 19th and early 20th century, but Mince-Pie House was demolished in 1902 and the Nunnery was demolished in 1911. The house was occupied by engineer Dr Laurence Holker Potts from 1838, where he set up a laboratory creating equipment to treat spinal injuries. He left the house before his death in 1850.

== The School ==
Oil merchant Alexander Duckham, who bought the castle in 1907 as his London home, added a prominent weathervane shaped like a duck in flight. He donated the house (and Rooks Hill House in Sevenoaks) to the RAF Benevolent Fund in 1920 to be used as a school for the children of RAF personnel who had been killed in service. The new school also provided the choir for the Royal Naval College chapel, on the further side of Greenwich park. The boys were initially taught by Captain Slimming, in the only school room, before moving up to the nearby The John Roan School. The Wakefield Wing was added in 1938, but at the outbreak of war in 1939 the boys were evacuated to Rye and Bexhill. Once it was realised that any German invasion would most probably occur in that area, the school moved again to Wales. The building became Grade I listed property in October 1951.

The choral educator James William Webb-Jones was Headmaster of the school from 1951 to 1955. The choral musician Peter Stanley Lyons (who was simultaneously Director of Music at the Royal Naval College, Greenwich) was Director of Music at the school from 1950 to 1954. The Cambridge musicologist Peter le Huray was Sunday organist at the school during Lyons's tenure as its Director of Music.

The school moved to Duke of Kent School in Ewhurst, Surrey, in 1976. Vanbrugh Castle was then acquired by a group of four people for £100,000 and converted to four private flats. In the 1980s, scenes from the film Mona Lisa were performed on location on the front circular driveway of Vanbrugh Castle.

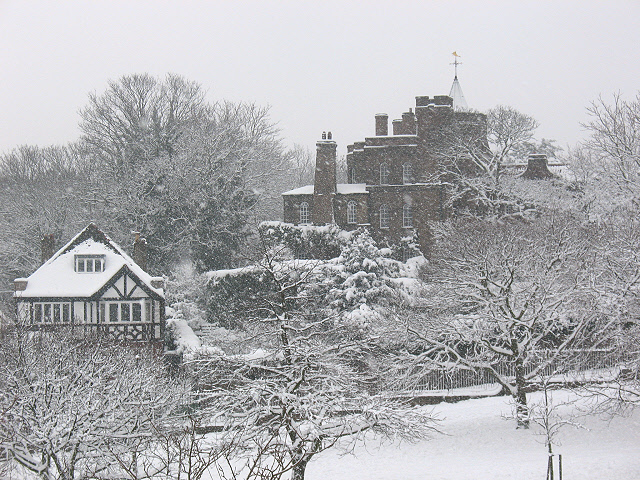

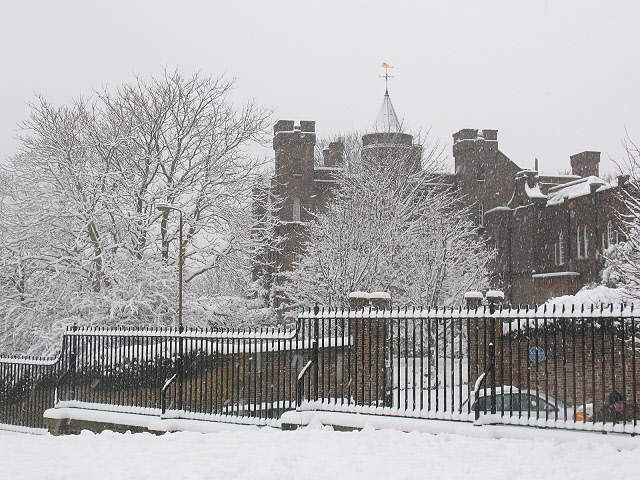
