= Department of Scientific and Industrial Research =

Department of Scientific and Industrial Research, abbreviated DSIR was the name of several British Empire organisations founded after the 1923 Imperial Conference to foster intra-Empire trade and development.

- Department of Scientific and Industrial Research (United Kingdom), a department of the British Government responsible for the organisation, development and encouragement of scientific and industrial research
- Department of Scientific and Industrial Research (New Zealand), a now-defunct government science agency in New Zealand, founded in 1926 and broken into Crown Research Institutes in 1992
- Department of Scientific and Industrial Research (India)

== See also ==
- Commonwealth Scientific and Industrial Research Organisation the parallel organisation in Australia
