= Geometric Constructions =

1998 mathematics textbook

- Author: George E. Martin
- Language: English
- Series: Undergraduate Texts in Mathematics
- Release number: 81
- Subject: Constructible numbers
- Genre: Mathematics
- Publisher: Springer-Verlag
- Publication date: 1998

Geometric Constructions is a mathematics textbook on constructible numbers, and more generally on using abstract algebra to model the sets of points that can be created through certain types of geometric construction, and using Galois theory to prove limits on the constructions that can be performed. It was written by George E. Martin, and published by Springer-Verlag in 1998 as volume 81 of their Undergraduate Texts in Mathematics book series.

== Topics ==
Geometric Constructions has ten chapters. The first two discuss straightedge and compass constructions, including many of the constructions from Euclid's Elements, and their algebraic model, the constructible numbers. They also include impossibility results for the classical Greek problems of straightedge and compass construction the impossibility of doubling the cube and trisecting the angle are proved algebraically, while the impossibility of squaring the circle and constructing some regular polygons is mentioned but not proved.

The next four chapters study what happens when the use of the compass or straightedge is restricted: by the Mohr–Mascheroni theorem there is no loss in constructibility if one uses only a compass, but a straightedge without a compass has significantly less power, unless an auxiliary circle is provided (the Poncelet–Steiner theorem). These chapters also discuss the restriction of compasses to dividers, tools that can transfer line segments onto equal segments of other lines but cannot be used to find intersections of circles with other curves, or to rusty compasses, compasses that cannot change radius, and they use dividers to construct the Malfatti circles.

The final three chapters go beyond the straightedge and compass to other construction tools. A highly restricted form of construction, the "match-stick geometry" of Thomas Rayner Dawson from the 1930s, uses only unit line segments, which can be placed along each other, intersected, or pivoted around one of their endpoints; despite its limited nature, this turns out to be as powerful as straightedge and compass. Chapter 9 considers neusis constructions with a marked ruler, and the final chapter investigates the mathematics of paper folding; the marked ruler and paper folding models are equivalent algebraically, and both allow constructions for angle trisection.

As well as the mathematics it describes, Geometric Constructions includes many pieces of historical background, quotations and pointers to source material for additional reading, and solutions and hints to its many exercises.

== Audience and reception ==
Martin originally intended his book to be a graduate-level textbook for students planning to become mathematics teachers. However, as well as this use, it can also be read by anyone who is interested in the history of geometry and has an undergraduate-level background in abstract algebra, or used as a reference work on the topic of geometric constructions.

Reviewer Horst Martini writes that it "conveys joy in the subject", while Maurice Burke describes the book as one that "invites the reader to play the game, take frequent side trips—many unexpected, and enjoy the ride".
