= John Thorp (physician) =

American obstetrician-gynecologist

John Mercer Thorp, Jr. (born 1957 or 1958) is an American obstetrician-gynecologist a Faculty Fellow at the Carolina Population Center, and the Hugh McAllister Distinguished Professor in the Department of Obstetrics and Gynecology at the University of North Carolina at Chapel Hill (UNC), where he directs the Division of General Obstetrics and Gynecology and serves as Vice Chair of Research.

== Education ==
Originally from Rocky Mount, North Carolina, Thorp attended the University of North Carolina at Chapel Hill and the Brody School of Medicine at East Carolina University. He went on to complete his residency and fellowship training at the University of North Carolina in Chapel Hill.

== Academic career ==
In addition to his positions at UNC, Thorp is also the medical director of Reply OB/GYN & Fertility in Cary, North Carolina. At UNC, he has helped the Department of Obstetrics and Gynecology establish a clinical training program in Lilongwe, Malawi.

== Research ==
Thorp's research interests include preterm birth and cervical insufficiency. He also serves as the principal investigator for UNC in the National Institutes of Health's Maternal-Fetal Medicine Units Network. He has researched the ability of progestins to prevent preterm births, and the neuroprotective effects of magnesium in premature infants. He was also a principal investigator in the clinical trials conducted on flibanserin in the United States.

== Testimony in abortion cases ==
Thorp has testified on behalf of Alabama and Wisconsin in court cases regarding admitting-privileges laws enacted in those states. In Wisconsin, Thorp testified that there were no reliable data regarding maternal deaths from abortion in the United States, to which judge William M. Conley replied by invoking Mark Twain's quote that there are "lies, damn lies and statistics". Conley later struck down Wisconsin's admitting-privileges law, writing in his decision that it had little, if any, benefit to women's health. His decision also stated, "In light of the deep flaws in his analysis and his testimony, which often came off more as advocacy then expert opinion, the court finds little to credit in Dr. Thorp’s opinions of the relative risks of abortions to child birth or comparable invasive procedures." In 2014, U.S. district judge Myron H. Thompson rejected two of Thorp's arguments in an Alabama case regarding an admitting privileges requirement for abortion providers.

== Personal life ==
Thorp and his wife, Joe Carol, live in Chapel Hill, North Carolina. They have four children and two grandchildren.
