= Guido Mislin =

Swiss mathematician, academic and researcher

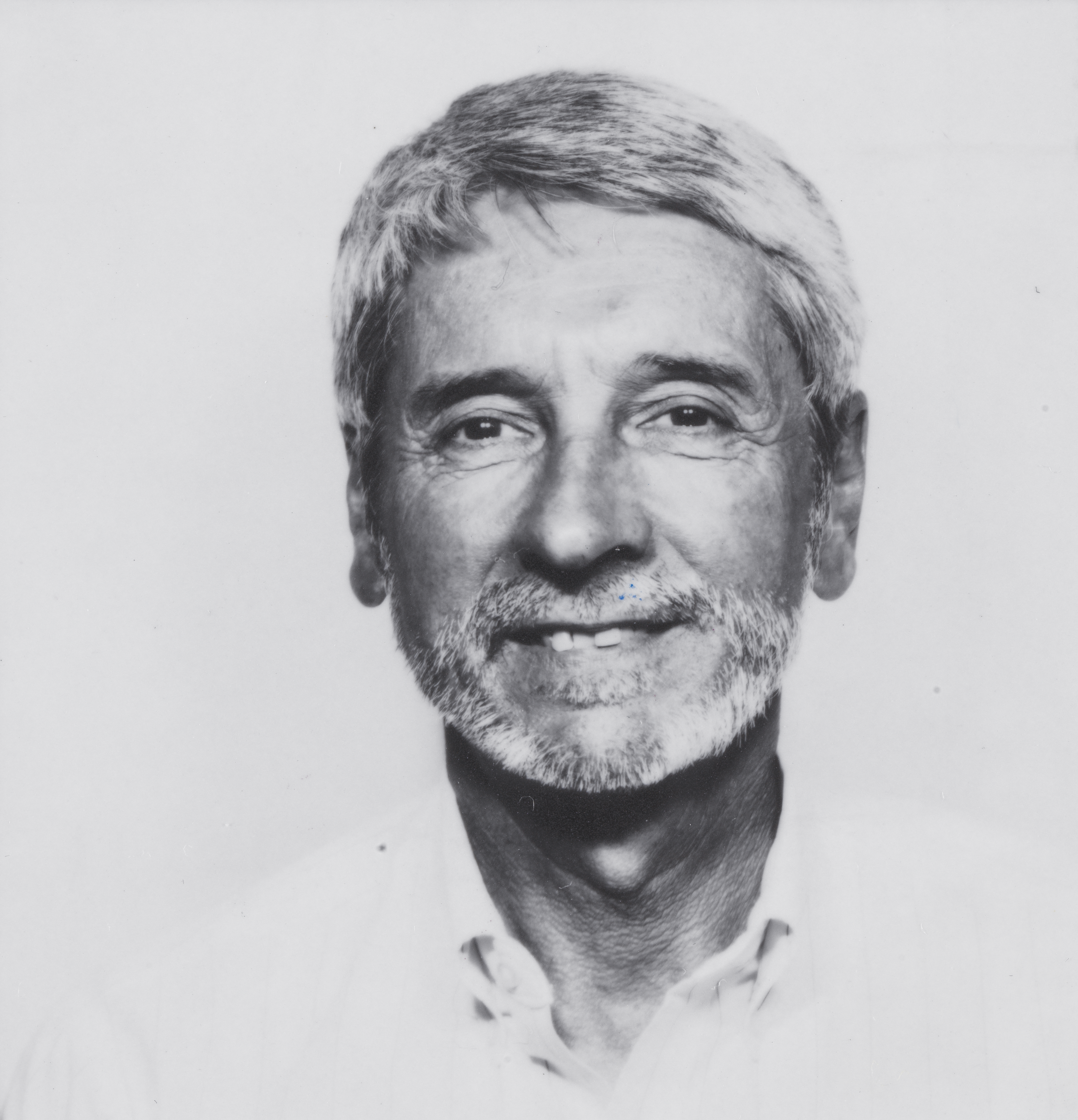
- Born: April 13, 1941 (age 85); Basel, Switzerland
- Occupations: Mathematician, academic and researcher

Academic background
- Education: Ph.D.
- Alma mater: ETH Zurich
- Thesis: Über Gruppen, die in Cohomologie-Moore-Räumen operieren

Guido Mislin (born April 13, 1941 in Basel) is a Swiss mathematician, academic and researcher. He is a Professor Emeritus of Mathematics at ETH Zurich. He is also associated with Ohio State University as a guest at Mathematics Department.

Mislin's main area of research is algebraic topology, focusing especially on questions regarding general localization theory, as they occur in the context of homotopy theory. He has also conducted research in the field of cohomology of groups and algebraic K-Theory of group rings. He has published over 90 research articles and several books including Localization of Nilpotent Groups and Spaces and Proper Group Actions and the Baum-Connes Conjecture.

== Education ==
Mislin completed his undergraduate studies and diploma in Mathematics in 1964 and received his Ph.D. in 1967 from ETH Zūrich. He then moved to U.S. and completed his post-doctoral studies from Cornell University and University of California, Berkeley.

== Career ==
Following his post-doctoral studies, Mislin was appointed as an assistant professor at the Ohio State University. In 1972, he moved back to Switzerland and joined ETH Zurich as an Associate Professor of Mathematics. He was promoted to Professor of Mathematics in 1979. Mislin headed the Department of Mathematics from 1998 till 2002. He retired in 2006 and was gifted with Guido's Book of Conjectures, which is a collection of short notes written by 91 different authors. Mislin is associated with ETH Zurich as a Professor Emeritus of Mathematics.

== Research ==
Mislin specializes in algebraic topology, and has conducted research focusing especially on questions regarding general localization theory. He has also worked on cohomology of groups and algebraic K-Theory of group rings.

Mislin studied the cohomology of classifying spaces of complex Lie groups and related discrete groups. His work proved that the Generalized Isomorphism Conjecture is equivalent to a Finite Subgroup Conjecture, generalizing earlier results due to Mark Feshbach and John Milnor, without using Becker-Gottlieb transfer. He presented a theorem regarding constructing torsion classes in systemic manner, by using Chern classes of canonical representation. He discussed the results and also proved certain properties regarding the Chern classes of representations of cyclic groups.

Mislin authored a paper in 1990s regarding group homomorphisms inducing mod-p cohomology isomorphisms and highlighted the conditions on p in group theoretic terms for p to induce an H'Z/p-isomorphism. He applied the concept of satellites in order to define Tate cohomology groups for an arbitrary group G and G-module M.

Mislin focused on Bass conjecture and conducted a study to prove that the Bost Conjecture on the L1-assembly map for discrete groups implies the Bass Conjecture. He reformulated the weak Bass Conjecture as a comparison of ordinary and L2-Lefschetz numbers.

Mislin studied and extended the work conducted by several authors on theory of topological localization. He presented new results to the theory which were then applied to other studies. Mislin also presented a periodicity theorem and proved the various properties of homotopy groups of K-theory localization.

== Awards and honors ==
- 1968 - Silver Medal, ETH Zurich

== Bibliography ==
=== Selected books ===
- Localization of Nilpotent Groups and Spaces (1975) ISBN 978-1483258744
- Proper Group Actions and the Baum-Connes Conjecture (Advanced Courses in Mathematics - CRM Barcelona) (2003) ISBN 978-3764304089

=== Selected articles ===
- Mislin, G. (1994). Tate cohomology for arbitrary groups via satellites. Topology and its Applications, 56(3), 293–300.
- Kropholler, P. H., & Mislin, G. (1998). Groups acting on finite dimensional spaces with finite stabilizers. Commentarii Mathematici Helvetici, 73(1), 122–136.
- Friedlander, E. M., & Mislin, G. (1984). Cohomology of classifying spaces of complex Lie groups and related discrete groups. Commentarii Mathematici Helvetici, 59(1), 347–361.
- Mislin, G. (1990). On group homomorphisms inducing mod-p cohomology isomorphisms. Commentarii Mathematici Helvetici, 65(1), 454–461.
- Mislin, G. (1974). Nilpotent groups with finite commutator subgroups. In Localization in Group Theory and Homotopy Theory (pp. 103–120). Springer, Berlin, Heidelberg.
