= John Thorpe (antiquarian, 1682–1750) =

English physician, antiquarian and Fellow of the Royal Society

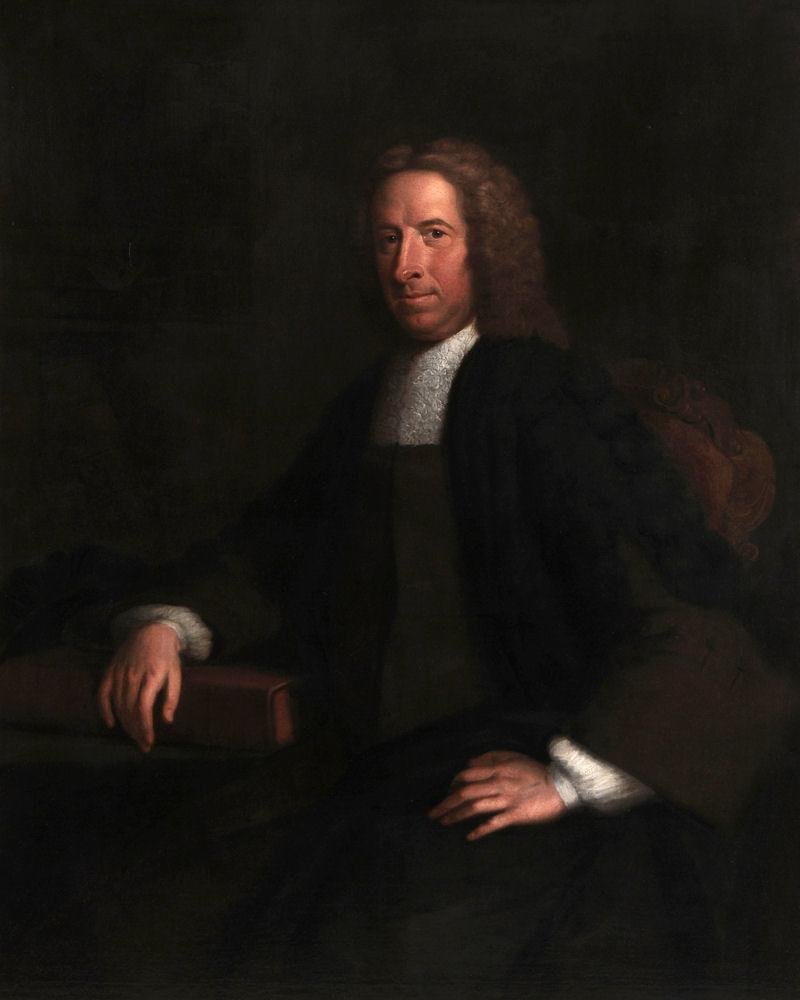
- portrait by John Wollaston
- Born: 12 March 1682; Penshurst
- Died: 30 November 1750 (aged 68); Rochester
- Alma mater: University of Oxford
- Occupation: Medical doctor, antiquarian
- Children: John Thorpe

John Thorpe (1682–1750) was an English physician, antiquarian and Fellow of the Royal Society.

== Life ==
The eldest son of John Thorpe and his wife Ann, sister and coheiress of Oliver Combridge of Newhouse, Kent, he was born at his father's house of Newhouse in the parish of Penshurst, Kent, on 12 March 1682; his father had an estate in the parishes of Penshurst, Lamberhurst, Tonbridge, and Chiddingstone. He was sent to Westerham grammar school, where the master was Thomas Manningham, and on 14 April 1698 matriculated at University College, Oxford, graduating B.A. at Michaelmas 1701, M.A. on 27 June 1704, M.B. on 16 May 1707, and M.D. in July 1710.

Thorpe was elected a fellow of the Royal Society on 30 November 1705, and at that time lived in Ormond Street, London, near his friend Richard Mead, the physician. In 1715 he settled as a physician in Rochester, Kent where he lived within the precincts of the cathedral, and attained built up a practice. He died on 30 November 1750 at Rochester, and was buried in the church of Stockbury. He had supported Thomas Hearne, Browne Willis and other scholars, and gave medical aid to many of the poor in his district.

== Works ==
A student of the architecture, antiquities, and history of the county of Kent. Thorpe made collections that were published in 1769 by his son as Registrum Roffense. The book contains charters given in full, monumental inscriptions, and other historical materials. An index to the inscriptions appeared in 1885, edited by Frederick Arthur Crisp.

Thorpe assisted Sir Hans Sloane in the publication of Philosophical Transactions, and published there on 24 July 1704 a letter to Sloane on worms in the heads of sheep. He edited the Itinera Alpina Tria of Johann Jakob Scheuchzer, and published a sheet of lands contributory to, and a collection of statutes related to, Rochester bridge. Some of his letters were preserved in the Sloane collection.

== Family ==
Thorpe married Elizabeth, daughter of John Woodhouse of Shobdon, Herefordshire, and had one son John.

== Notes ==
Attribution

This article incorporates text from a publication now in the public domain: Lee, Sidney, ed. (1898). "Thorpe, John (1682-1750)". Dictionary of National Biography. Vol. 56. London: Smith, Elder & Co.
