= Jean Pedersen =

American mathematician

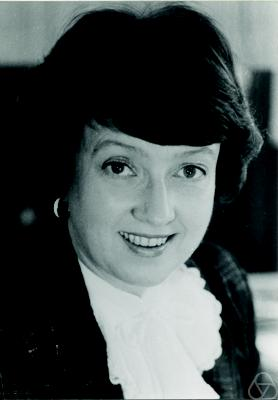
Jean J. Pedersen

Jean J. Pedersen (Sep 17, 1934–Jan 1, 2016) was an American mathematician and author particularly known for her works on the mathematics of paper folding.

== Education and career ==
Pedersen was born Thelma Jean Jorgenson in Salt Lake City, Utah, the daughter of an ophthalmologist and a teacher. She studied home economics changing to a double major in mathematics and physics as an undergraduate at Brigham Young University, before becoming a graduate student in mathematics at the University of Utah under the supervision of E. Allen Davis.

After completing her master's degree, she moved to San Jose, California, following her husband who worked for IBM. She joined the faculty at the Santa Clara University on a part-time basis in 1966, but shifted to full-time and was promoted to full professor in 1996. She was the first woman to teach mathematics at the university, and the first to be tenured as a mathematics professor.

Her discovery that the platonic solids could be braided from strips of paper led to Martin Gardner writing about it in the September, 1971 Mathematical Games column in Scientific American.

== Books ==
Pedersen's books include:

- Geometric Playthings (With Kent Pedersen, Dale Seymour Publications Secondary, 1973, ISBN 978-0866513517)
- Fear No More: An Adult Approach to Mathematics (with Peter Hilton, Dale Seymour Publications, 1982 ISBN 978-0201057133)
- Build Your Own Polyhedra (with Peter Hilton, Addison-Wesley, 1988)
- Mathematical Reflections: In a Room with Many Windows (with Peter Hilton and Derek Holton, Springer, 1996)
- Mathematical Vistas: From a Room with Many Windows (with Peter Hilton and Derek Holton, Springerl 2002)
- 99 Points of Intersection: Examples—Pictures—Proofs (by Hans Walser, translated with Peter Hilton, Mathematical Association of America, 2006)
- A Mathematical Tapestry: Demonstrating the Beautiful Unity of Mathematics (with Peter Hilton, illustrated by Sylvie Donmoyer, Cambridge University Press, 2010)

She and Peter Hilton also translated The Golden Section and Symmetry by Hans Walser from German into English. Both translations were published by the Mathematical Association of America in 2001.
