= Robert Desharnais =

American evolutionary biologist

- Education: University of Massachusetts, Boston; University of Rhode Island
- Scientific career
- Fields: Evolutionary biology, ecology
- Workplaces: California State University, Los Angeles
- Thesis: Population Dynamics and the Tribolium Model: Genetics and Demography (1982)
- Doctoral advisor: Robert F. Constantino

Robert A. Desharnais is an American evolutionary biologist who is an emeritus professor of biology at California State University, Los Angeles. His research area is population biology and ecology.

== Life ==
Desharnais studied biology at the University of Massachusetts, Boston, earning a Bachelor of Arts degree in 1976. At the University of Rhode Island, in 1979, he earned a Master of Science degree in zoology, and in 1982 he received a Doctor of Philosophy degree in zoology. His doctoral advisor was the population geneticist Robert F. Constantino.

After finishing his graduate studies, from 1982 to 1983, he was a postdoctoral fellow at Dalhousie University. From 1985 to 1987, he was a research associate at Rockefeller University, and from 1987 to 1988, he was an assistant professor] In 1988, he moved to Los Angeles, California to work as an assistant professor at California State University, Los Angeles, and in 1997, there he became full professor. He is an emeritus professor of biology. Some of his research interests are theoretical biology, nonlinear population dynamics, chaos theory in population ecology, and the role of natural selection in population dynamics.

== Selected works ==
- Population Dynamics and the Tribolium Model (1991)
- Chaos in Ecology (2003)
- Population Dynamics and Laboratory Ecology (2005)
