= John A. Thorpe =

American mathematician

John Alden Thorpe (February 29, 1936 – January 18, 2021) was an American mathematician, known for contributions to the field of differential geometry.

Thorpe obtained his Bachelor's degree in 1958 from the Massachusetts Institute of Technology. His Ph.D. was done at Columbia University, under the direction of James Eells (Higher Order Sectional Curvature). From 1963 to 1965, he was Moore Instructor at MIT and Assistant Professor at Haverford College in 1965. In 1967 and 1968 he was a visitor at the Institute for Advanced Study. From 1968, he was Associate Professor and then Professor at the State University of New York at Stony Brook (SUNY). From 1987 he was Professor and Dean at the State University of New York in Buffalo, and from 1993 at Queens College of City University of New York, where he also served as Provost. From 1984 to 1987 he served on the Board of Governors of the Mathematical Association of America. From 1998 to 2001 he was Executive Director of the National Council of Teachers of Mathematics.

He and Nigel Hitchin independently found an inequality between topological invariants, which provides a necessary condition for the existence of Einstein metrics on four-dimensional smooth compact manifolds. It is now known as the Hitchin-Thorpe inequality. Thorpe died on January 18, 2021, at the age of 84.

== Books ==
- Lecture Notes on Elementary Topology and Geometry (with I.M. Singer), Springer Verlag, Undergraduate Texts in Mathematics, 1967
- Linear Algebra, with Applications to Differential Equations (with Paul G. Kumpel), Holt, Rinehart and Winston, 1971
- Elementary Topics in Differential Geometry, Springer Verlag, Undergraduate Texts in Mathematics, 1979
- Elementary Linear Algebra (with Paul G. Kumpel), Saunders College Publishing, 1984
