= John Thorpe (antiquarian, 1715–1792) =

English antiquarian

John Thorpe (1715–1792) was an English antiquarian, known for works on Rochester, Kent.

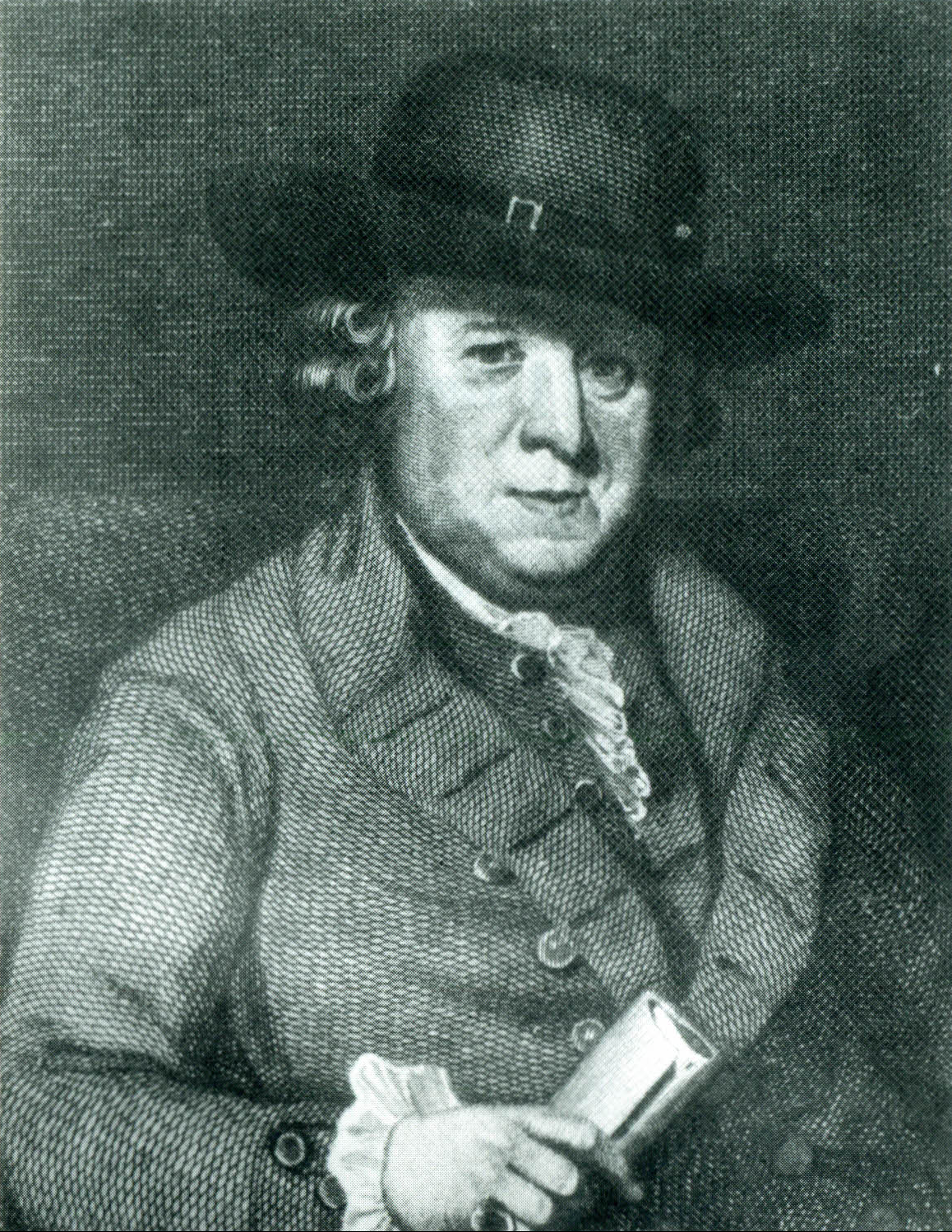
John Thorpe

== Life ==
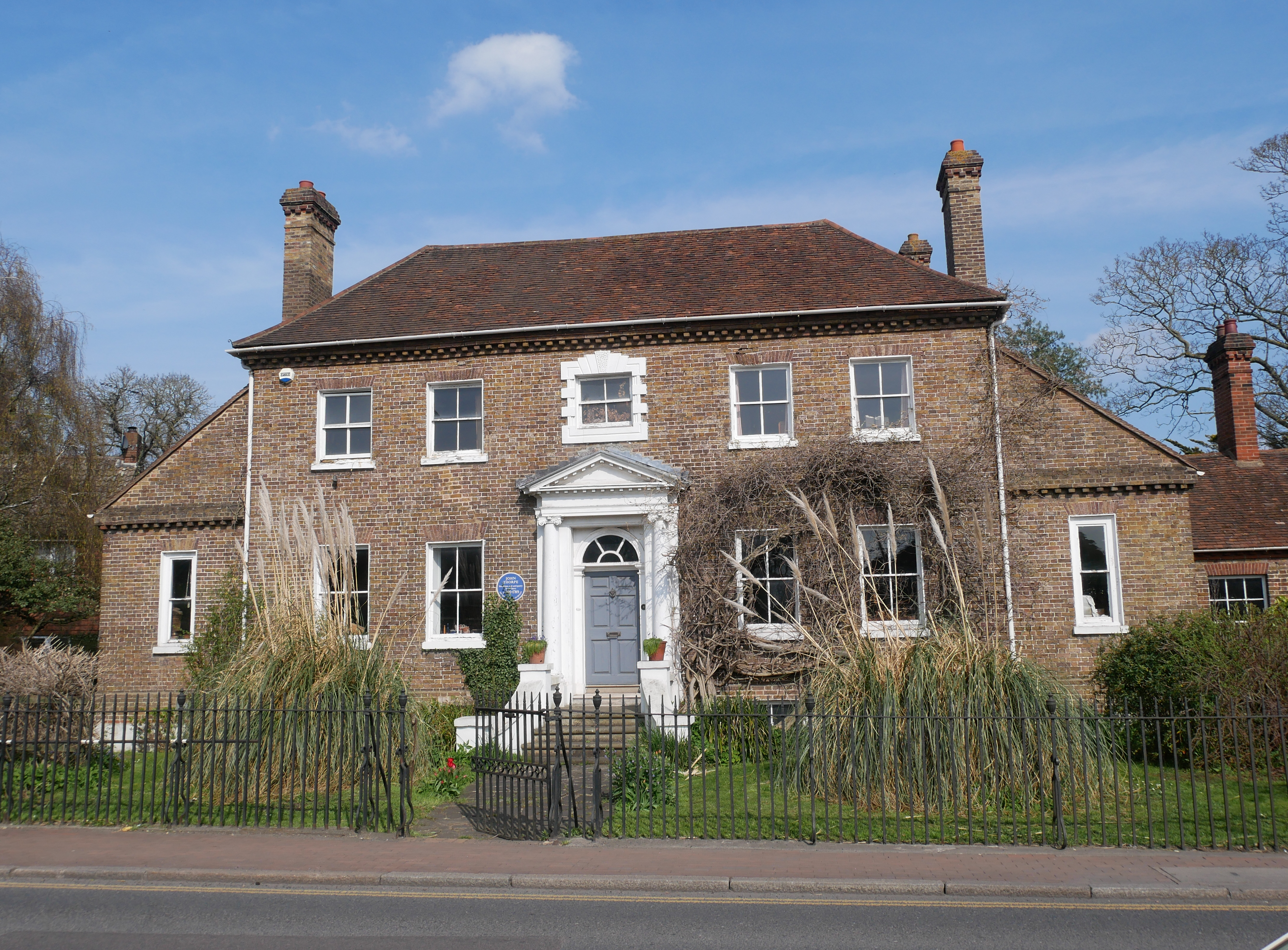
High Street House in Bexley, where Thorpe lived

He was the only son of John Thorpe of Rochester, by his wife Elizabeth, daughter of John Woodhouse of Shobdon, Herefordshire. He was educated at Ludsdown, Kent, under Samuel Thornton, and matriculated at University College, Oxford, on 22 March 1732, graduating B.A. in 1735 and M.A. in 1738.

After some study of medicine he abandoned it, and, like his father, concentrated on antiquarian research. In 1755 he was elected a fellow of the Society of Antiquaries of London. After residing for many years at High-street House, Bexley, Kent, he moved in 1789, after the death of his first wife, to Richmond Green, Surrey, and then to Chippenham in Wiltshire, where he died on 2 August 1792; he was buried in the churchyard of the neighbouring village of Hardenhuish.

== Works ==
In 1769 Thorpe published, with assistance from John Baynard of the Navy Office, his father's Registrum Roffense. In 1788 he supplemented it with the Custumale Roffense from the original manuscript, with other memorials of Rochester Cathedral.

His mention, in Custumale Roffense of a Roman mosaic pavement, discovered about 1750 in Lullingstone Park by workmen digging post holes, led archaeologists in 1949 to not only locate and uncover the pavement, but also to reveal the extensive Lullingstone Roman Villa to which it belonged.

Thorpe contributed also "Illustrations of several Antiquities in Kent which have hitherto remained undescribed" to the first volume of Bibliotheca Topographica Britannica’ A letter from him to Andrew Coltée Ducarel, maintaining in opposition to Daines Barrington, that the cherry is indigenous to England, was published in Philosophical Transactions during 1771, p. 152). He frequently wrote on antiquarian subjects in the Gentleman's Magazine.

== Family ==
Thorpe was twice married. His first wife, Catharina, whom he married in 1746, was the daughter of Laurence Holker, a physician of Gravesend. She died on 10 January 1789, leaving two daughters, Catharine and Ethelinda. On 6 July 1790 he married Mrs. Holland, a widow and his housekeeper.

== Notes ==
Attribution

This article incorporates text from a publication now in the public domain: Lee, Sidney, ed. (1898). "Thorpe, John (1715-1792)". Dictionary of National Biography. Vol. 56. London: Smith, Elder & Co.
