= Fotheringhay =

Village and civil parish in England

Coordinates: 52°31′45″N 0°26′47″W

- Village and civil parish
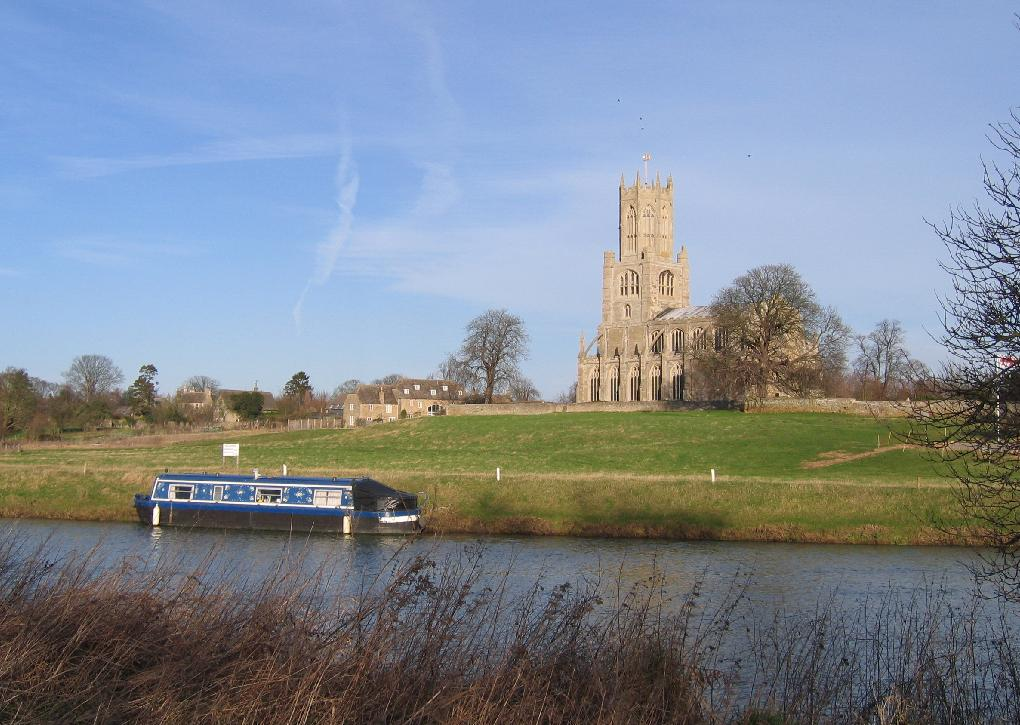
- Fotheringhay, across the River Nene

- Location within Northamptonshire
- Population: 119 (2011)
- OS grid reference: TL0593
- Civil parish: Fotheringhay
- Unitary authority: North Northamptonshire
- Ceremonial county: Northamptonshire
- Region: East Midlands
- Country: England
- Sovereign state: United Kingdom
- Post town: Peterborough
- Postcode district: PE8
- Dialling code: 01832
- Police: Northamptonshire
- Fire: Northamptonshire
- Ambulance: East Midlands
- UK Parliament: Corby and East Northamptonshire

Fotheringhay is a village and civil parish in North Northamptonshire, England. It is 4 miles (6.4 km) north-east of Oundle and around 13 miles (21 km) west of Peterborough. It is most noted for being the site of Fotheringhay (or Fotheringay) Castle which was razed in 1627. There is nothing left of the castle to be seen today other than the motte on which it was built that provides excellent views of the River Nene. The Nene Way long distance footpath runs through the village.

As the home of the great Yorkist line, the village was, for a considerable part of the 15th and 16th centuries, of national standing. The death of Richard III at Bosworth Field altered its history irrevocably. As the historian John Nicholls stated, "Fotheringhay has been distinguished beyond any other place in Britain, except the Capital, by the aggravated misfortunes of Royalty."

At the time of the 2001 census, the parish's population was 123 people, reducing to 119 at the 2011 census.

== History ==
The first written mention of a settlement here was in 1060, and the Domesday Book of 1086 lists the site as 'Fodringeia'. John Leland wrote this as 'Foderingeye' or "Fodering inclosure", referring to the section of the forest that is segregated for the purpose of producing hay. During the medieval period the village was variously mentioned as Foderingey, Foderinghay, Forderinghay, and Fotheringhaye.

Access to the village was formerly via a ford of the Nene adjacent to the former castle site. The first bridge built was ordered by Elizabeth I in 1573. The present bridge was built by George Portwood of Stamford in 1722 under the orders of the Earl of Nottingham, then proprietor of the estate.

In medieval times, it hosted a weekly market, held between at least the start of the fourteenth century and around the mid-fifteenth century, and was also the site of an annual fair beginning on the eve of the feast of St Michael (later moving to the Sunday after Relic Sunday in July and still celebrated in the nineteenth century).

Sixteenth-century Fotheringhay, as observed by Leland, consisted a single street of around 40 houses and a population of around 300. In the 17th century the population dropped sharply when the castle was destroyed. By 1811 it had risen to a peak of around 310 but has fallen steadily since. The present population is 125 (2006 est.).

The village was formerly home to a renowned grammar school, believed to have been formed as the continuation of the collegiate church and probably founded by Edward VI.

Notable former residents include Walter de Foderingey, the first principal of Balliol College, Oxford in 1282.

The lordship of the town and the castle passed through many hands through the years. From the Earl of Newport, the lordship passed to George Savile, 1st Marquess of Halifax, and thence to his son, William Savile, the second Marquis, who died without issue. The manor and castle were then sold by his father-in-law, Daniel Finch, 2nd Earl of Nottingham, to Hewer Edgeley Hewer (heir to William Hewer, Samuel Pepys' onetime servant and later protégé in the Admiralty). Hewer himself died without issue on 6 November 1728, when it passed to Hewer's heirs, the Blackborne family. In 1797 Samuel Pepys's great-great-nephew Samuel Pepys Cockerell sold the estate of Rev. Abraham Blackborne in Fotheringhay.

Eventually the lordship of the manor and castle came to the Belsey family.

== Fotheringhay Castle ==
After the manor came into the possession of Edward III he passed it to his son Edmund of Langley, 1st Duke of York, founder of the Yorkist line. The castle then became the home of the Dukes of York. Richard III was born there in 1452, and his father, Richard Plantagenet, 3rd Duke of York was re-buried at the nearby church in 1476. Duke Richard's wife, Cecily Neville, Duchess of York, was later interred in the same tomb. The tomb opposite contains the body of Edward, the 2nd Duke of York, who was killed at the Battle of Agincourt in 1415.

Fotheringhay is also where Mary, Queen of Scots, was tried and beheaded in 1587, and her body lay there for some months before its burial at Peterborough Cathedral and then its final burial in Westminster Abbey. Although it is often said that James I destroyed the castle because his mother was killed there, the facts are rather more prosaic; it fell into such disrepair that it had to be pulled down, and the stones were all taken to be used in other buildings. Local legend has it that the staircase from the castle is now in the Talbot Hotel in Oundle.

== Church of St Mary and All Saints ==
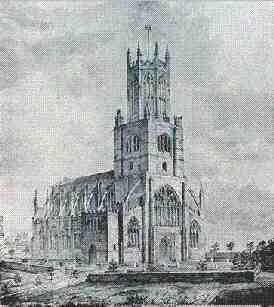
Fotheringhay Church

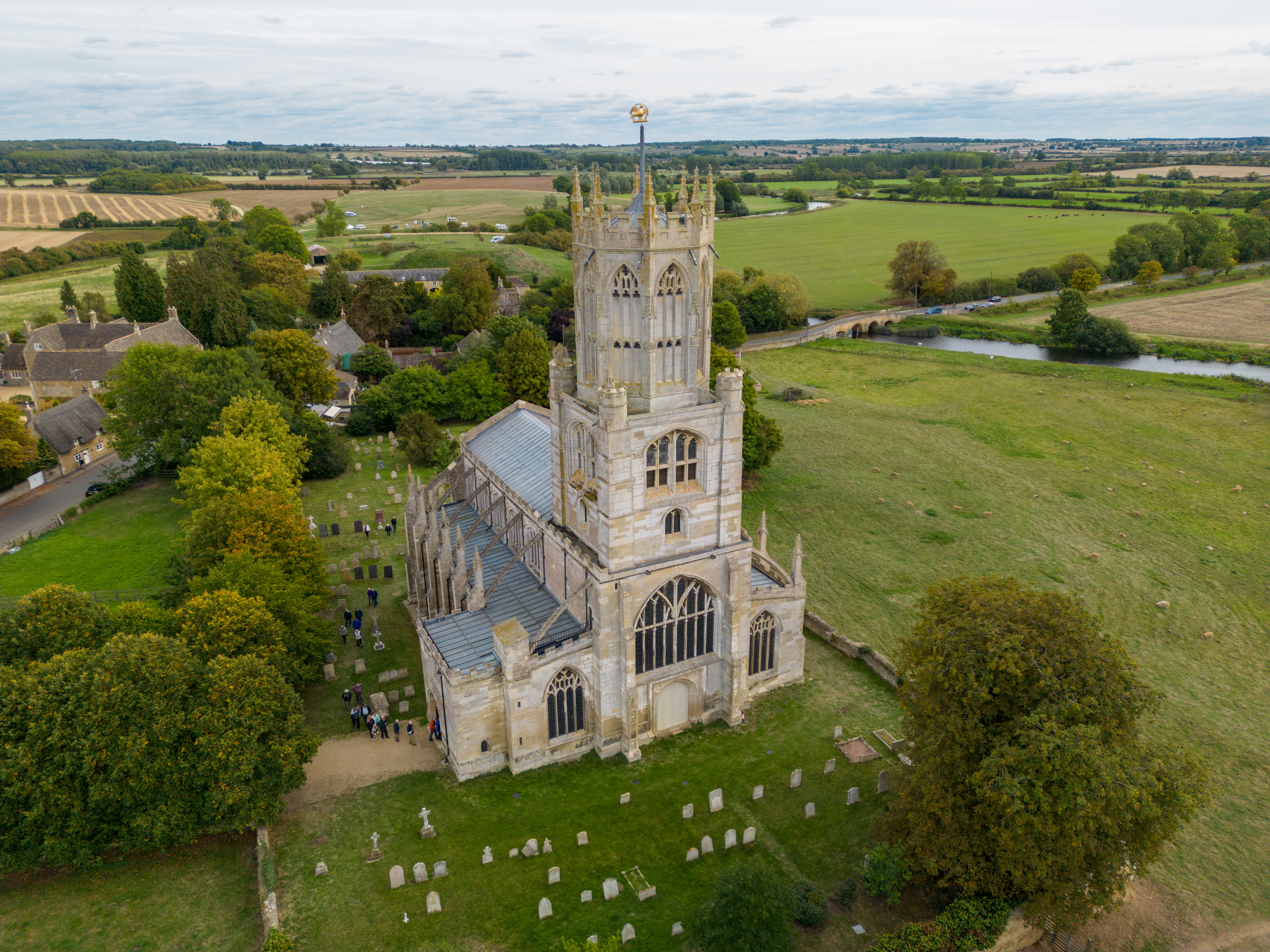
Church of St Mary and All Saints, Fotheringhay

The work on the present church was begun by Edward III who also built a college as a cloister on the church's southern side. After completion in around 1430, a parish church of similar style was added to the western end of the collegiate church with work beginning in 1434. It is the parish church which still remains.

The large present church is named in honour of St Mary and All Saints, and has a distinctive tall tower dominating the local skyline. The church is Perpendicular in style and although only the nave, aisles and octagonal tower remain of the original building it is still in the best style of its period.

The church contains a notable 15th-century painted pulpit donated by Edward IV.

Edward of Norwich, 2nd Duke of York, who was killed at the Battle of Agincourt in 1415, Richard Plantagenet, 3rd Duke of York, and his wife, Cecily Neville as well as his son Edmund, Earl of Rutland, who with Richard himself, fell at the Battle of Wakefield in 1460, are buried in the church. After the choir of the church was destroyed in the 16th century, Elizabeth I ordered the removal of the smashed York tombs and created the present monuments to the third Duke and his wife around the altar.

The birthday of Richard III is commemorated annually by the Richard III Society by the placing of white roses in the church.
