= Portwood (surname) =

Portwood is a surname. Notable people with the surname include:

- Amber Portwood (born 1990), American reality television personality
- Cliff Portwood (1937–2012), English footballer, singer and television personality
- George Portwood (died c. 1744), English carpenter and architect
