= Ex indumentis =

Second Class holy relics

Example of a modern religious medal improperly marked "Ex Indumentis" that is not truly "from the clothing" of the saint

The phrase ex indumentis is Latin for "from the clothing", most commonly used when referring to Second Class holy relics of saints or blessed individuals.

In proper ecclesiastical phraseology, ex indumentis should only be used when referring to an article or fragment of clothing that was owned or used by a saint (or similarly blessed individual).

In recent years, numerous contemporary manufacturers of relic medals, holy plaques, saint statues and religious trinkets have begun to label their items as being ex indumentis; rather, they are merely pieces of inexpensive cloth or canvas that have been touched to an actual relic of the saint, then stamped out en-masse to be attached to their souvenir medals or statues. As such, they are 3rd-class relics and not 2nd-class relics, as the phrase ex indumentis implies.

True examples of genuine ex indumentis relics are considered to be treasures of the faithful and should be venerated in accordance with theological laws. Unauthentic examples of ex indumentis relics have no sacramental value as such.
