= Relic =

Object of religious significance from the past

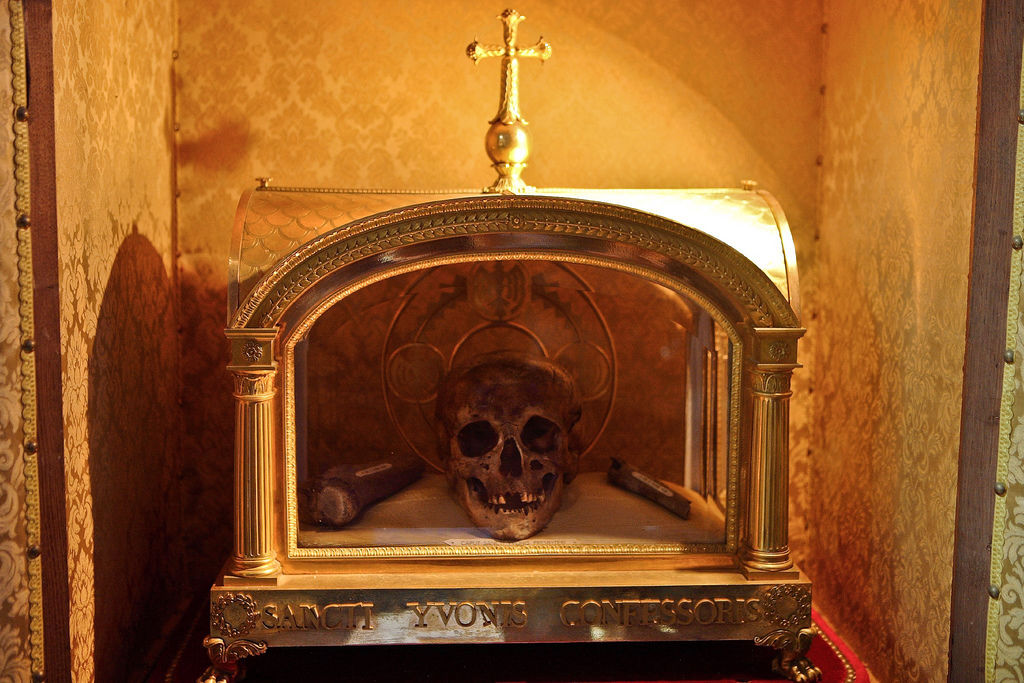
The reliquary and skull of Saint Ivo of Kermartin (St. Yves or St. Ives; 1253–1303), in Tréguier, Brittany, France

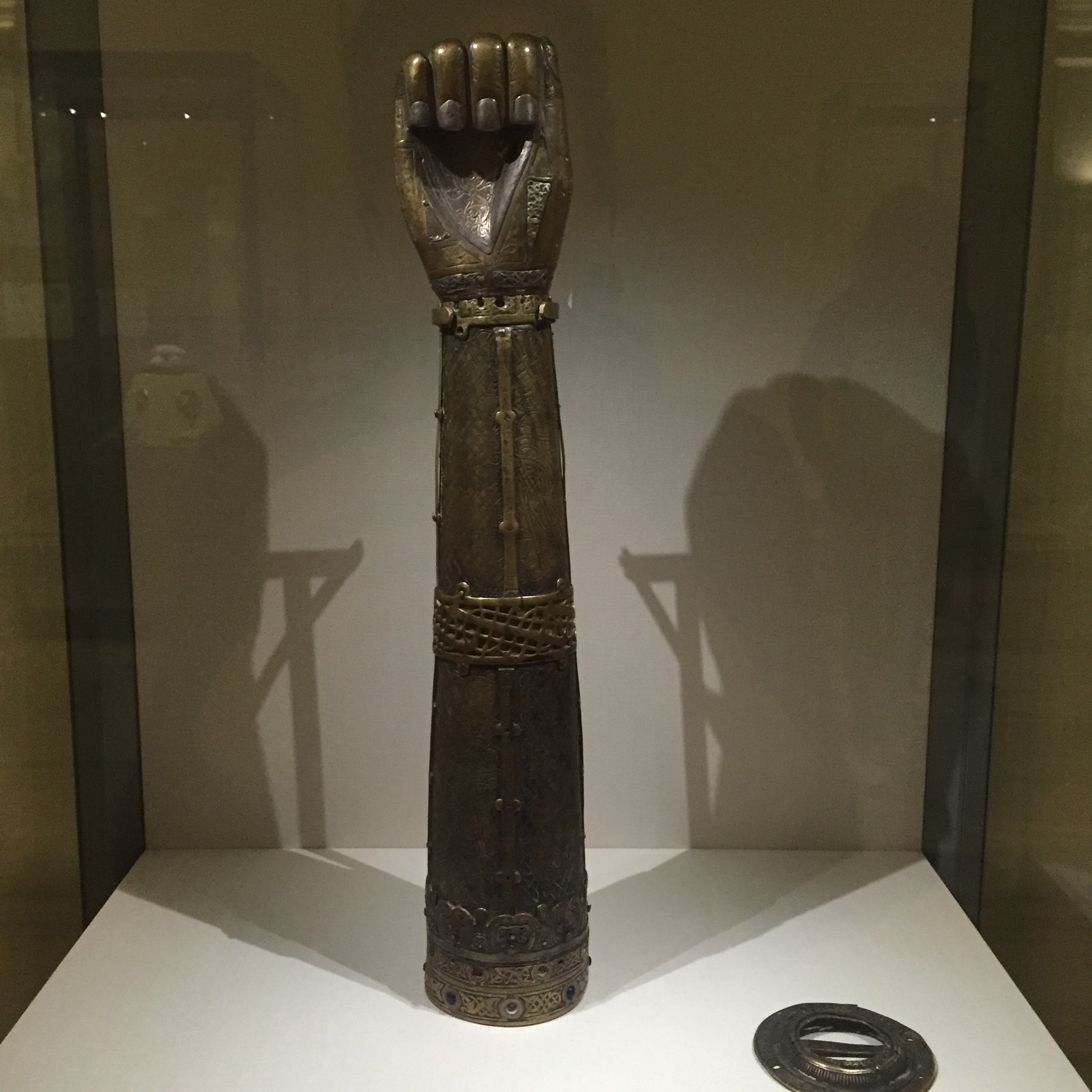
Shrine of Saint Lachtin's Arm, 12th century, Irish

In religion, a relic is an object or article of religious significance from the past. It usually consists of the physical remains or personal effects of a saint or other person preserved for the purpose of veneration as a tangible memorial. Relics are an important aspect of some forms of Buddhism, Hinduism, Christianity, Islam, Shamanism, and many other religions. Relic derives from the Latin reliquiae, meaning "remains", and a form of the Latin verb relinquere, to "leave behind, or abandon". A reliquary is a shrine that houses one or more religious relics.

== In classical antiquity ==
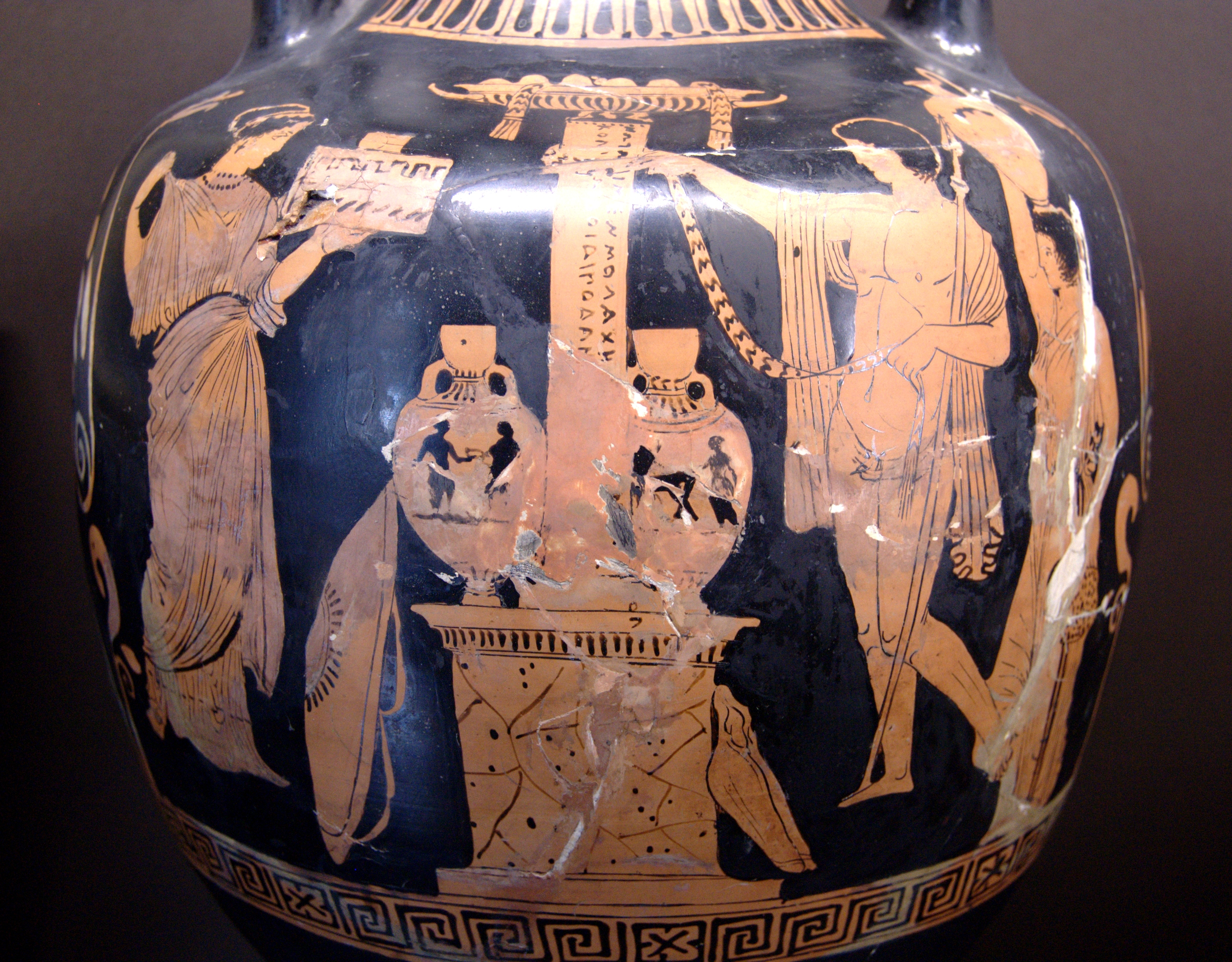
An amphora depicting a Greek hero cult in honor of Oedipus (Apulian red-figure, 380–370 BC)

In ancient Greece, a city or sanctuary might claim to possess, without necessarily displaying, the remains of a venerated hero as a part of a hero cult. Other venerable objects associated with the hero were more likely to be on display in sanctuaries, such as spears, shields, or other weaponry; chariots, ships or figureheads; furniture such as chairs or tripods; and clothing. The sanctuary of the Leucippides at Sparta claimed to display the egg of Leda.

The bones were not regarded as holding a particular power derived from the hero, with some exceptions, such as the divine shoulder of Pelops held at Olympia. Miracles and healing were not regularly attributed to them; rather, their presence was meant to serve a tutelary function, as the tomb of Oedipus was said to protect Athens.

The bones of Orestes and Theseus were supposed to have been stolen or removed from their original resting place and reburied. On the advice of the Delphic Oracle, the Spartans searched for the bones of Orestes and brought them home, without which they had been told they could not expect victory in their war against the neighboring Tegeans. Plutarch says that the Athenians were likewise instructed by the oracle to locate and steal the relics of Theseus from the Dolopians.

The body of the legendary Eurystheus was also supposed to protect Athens from enemy attack, and in Thebes, that of the prophet Amphiaraus, whose cult was oracular and healing. Plutarch narrates transferrals similar to that of Theseus for the bodies of the historical Demetrius I of Macedon and Phocion the Good. The bones or ashes of Aesculapius at Epidaurus, and of Perdiccas I at Macedon, were treated with the deepest veneration.

As with the relics of Theseus, the bones are sometimes described in literary sources as gigantic, an indication of the hero's "larger than life" status. On the basis of their reported size, it has been conjectured that such bones were those of prehistoric creatures, the startling discovery of which may have prompted the sanctifying of the site.

The head of the poet-prophet Orpheus was supposed to have been transported to Lesbos, where it was enshrined and visited as an oracle. The 2nd-century geographer Pausanias reported that the bones of Orpheus were kept in a stone vase displayed on a pillar near Dion, his place of death and a major religious center. These too were regarded as having oracular power, which might be accessed through dreaming in a ritual of incubation. The accidental exposure of the bones brought a disaster upon the town of Libretha, whence the people of Dion had transferred the relics to their own keeping.

According to the Chronicon Paschale, the bones of the Persian Zoroaster were venerated, but the tradition of Zoroastrianism and its scriptures offer no support of this.

== Christianity ==
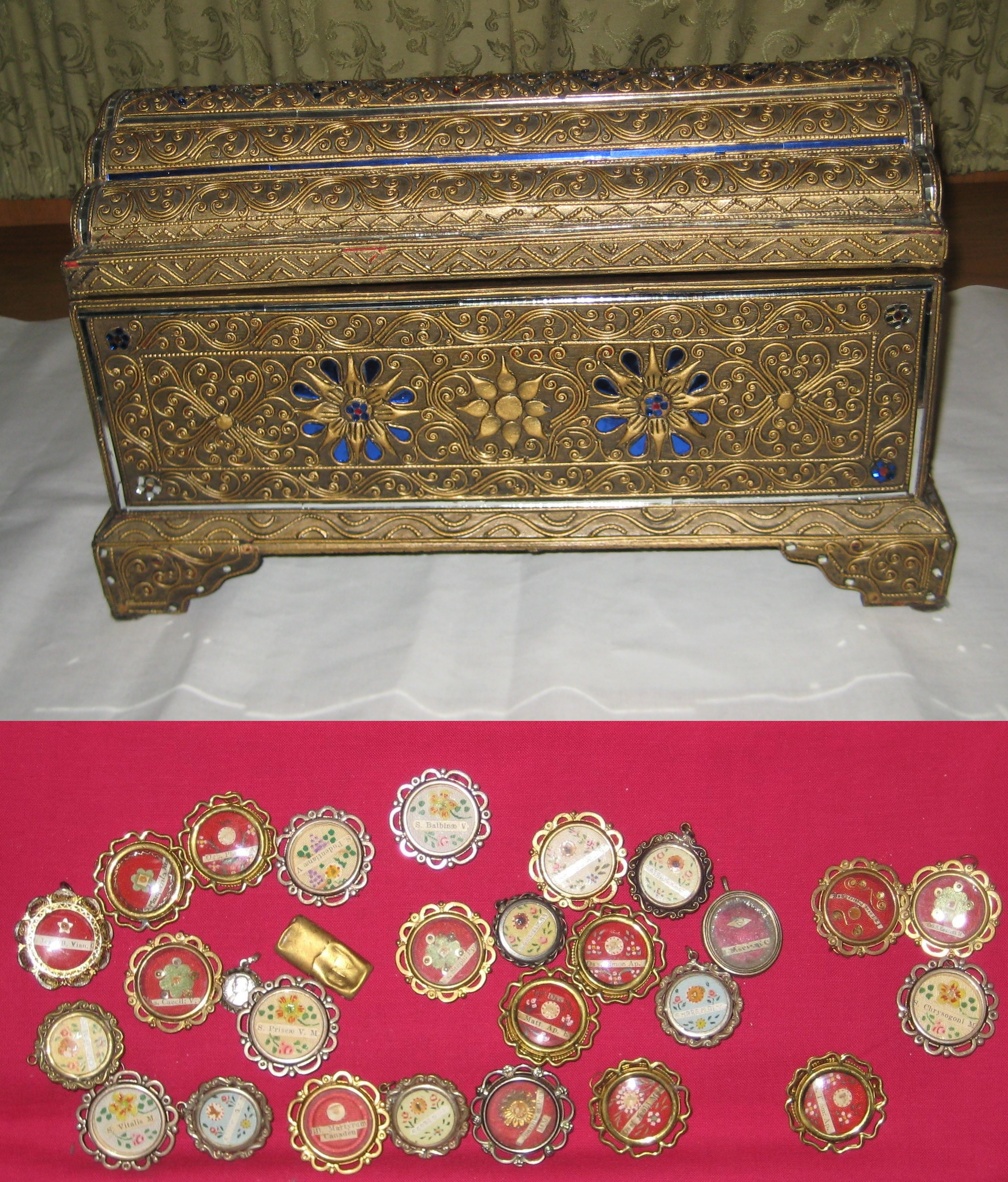
A reliquary at Pope St. John XXIII National Seminary in the United States, with relics of St. James, St. Matthew, St. Philip, St. Simon, St. Thomas, St. Stephen and other saints

=== History ===
One of the earliest sources that purports to show the efficacy of relics is found in 2 Kings 13:20–21:

And Elisha died, and they buried him. Now the bands of the Moabites used to invade the land at the coming in of the year. And it came to pass, as they were burying a man, that, behold, they spied a band; and they cast the man into the sepulchre of Elisha; and as soon as the man touched the bones of Elisha, he revived, and stood up on his feet.

Also cited is the veneration of relics from the martyr and bishop Saint Polycarp of Smyrna recorded in the Martyrdom of Polycarp, written sometime from 150 to 160 AD. With regard to relics that are objects, an often cited passage is Acts 19:11–12, which says that Paul the Apostle's handkerchiefs were imbued by God with healing power. In the gospel accounts of Jesus healing the bleeding woman and again in the Gospel of Mark 6:56, those who touched Jesus's garment were healed.

The practice of venerating relics seems to have been taken for granted by writers like Augustine, St. Ambrose, Gregory of Nyssa, St. Chrysostom, and St. Gregory Nazianzen. Dom Bernardo Cignitti, O.S.B., wrote, "[T]he remains of certain dead are surrounded with special care and veneration. This is because the mortal remains of the deceased are associated in some manner with the holiness of their souls which await reunion with their bodies in the resurrection." Thomas Aquinas (d. 1274) pointed out that it was natural that people should treasure what is associated with the dead, much like the personal effects of a relative. In an interview with Catholic News Service, Fr. Mario Conte, executive editor of the Messenger of St. Anthony magazine in Padua, Italy, said, "Saints' relics help people overcome the abstract and make a connection with the holy ... Saints do not perform miracles. Only God performs miracles, but saints are intercessors."

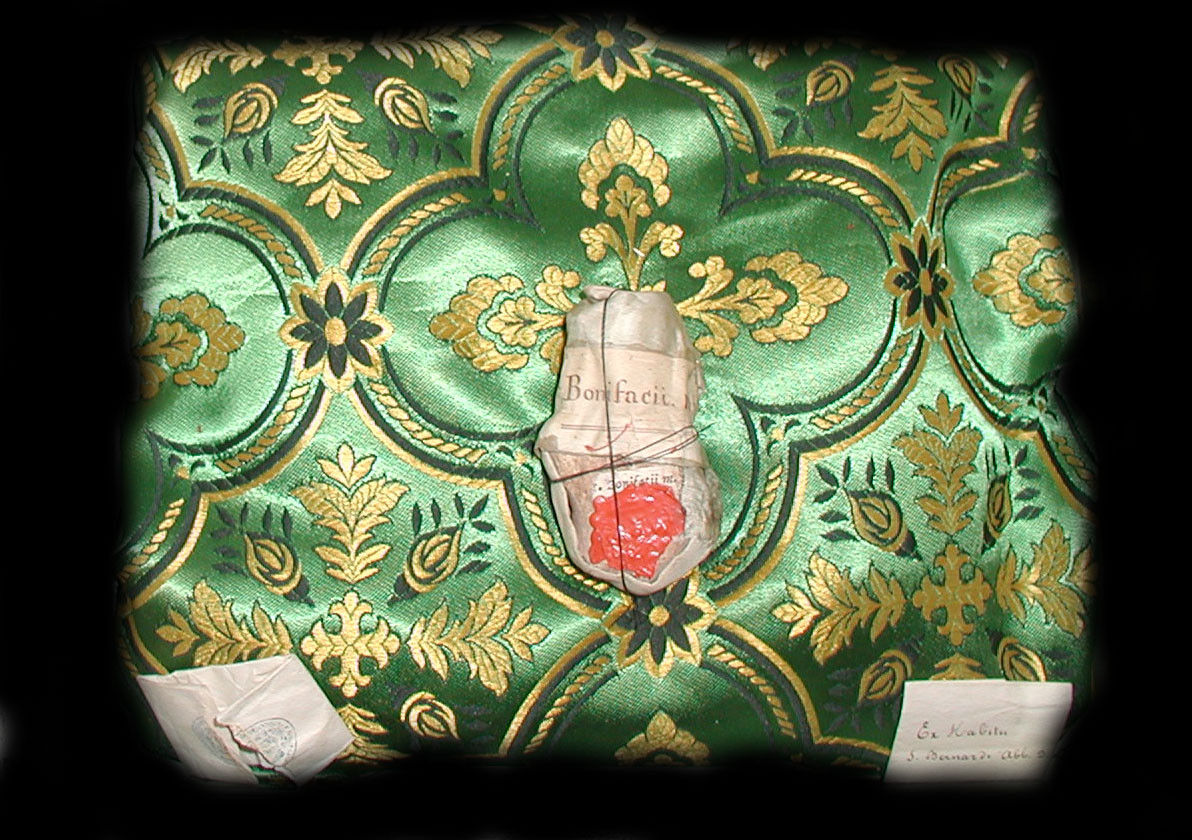
A relic from the shrine of Saint Boniface of Dokkum in the hermit-church of Warfhuizen: the bone fragment in middle is from Saint Boniface; the folded papers on the left and right contain bone fragments of Saint Benedict of Nursia and Bernard of Clairvaux.

In the early Church the disturbance of the remains of martyrs and other saints was not practiced. They were allowed to remain in their often unidentified resting places such as in cemeteries and the catacombs of Rome. These places were always outside the walls of the city, but martyriums began to be built over the site of the burial. Since it was considered beneficial to the soul to be buried close to the remains of saints, several large "funerary halls" were built over the sites of martyr's graves, including Old Saint Peter's Basilica. These were initially not regular churches, but "covered cemeteries" crammed with graves, wherein was celebrated funerary and memorial services. It may have been thought that when the souls of the martyrs went to heaven on resurrection day they would be accompanied by those interred nearby, who would thus gain favour with God.

Some early Christians attributed healing powers to the dust from graves of saints, including Gregory of Tours. The cult of Martin of Tours was very popular in Merovingian Gaul, and centered at a great church built just outside the walls of Tours. When Saint Martin died on November 8, 397, at a village halfway between Tours and Poitiers, the inhabitants of these cities were ready to fight for his body, which the people of Tours managed to secure by stealth. Tours became the chief point of Christian pilgrimage in Gaul, a place for the healing of the sick.

Gregory of Tours travelled to the shrine when he had contracted a serious illness. Later, as bishop of Tours, Gregory wrote extensively about miracles attributed to the intercession of St Martin. Nestorian Christianity utilized the hanānā–a mixture made with the dust of Thomas the Apostle's tomb–for healing. Within the Assyrian Church of the East, it is consumed by a couple getting married in the Mystery of Crowning.

The Second Council of Nicaea in 787 drew on the teaching of St. John Damascene that homage or respect is not really paid to an inanimate object, but to the holy person, the veneration of a holy person is itself honour paid to God. The Council decreed that every altar should contain a relic, making it clear that this was already the norm, as it remains to the present day in Catholic and Orthodox churches. The veneration of the relics of the saints reflects a belief that the saints in heaven intercede for those on earth. A number of cures and miracles have been attributed to relics, not because of their own power, but because of the holiness of the saint they represent.

Many tales of miracles and other marvels were attributed to relics beginning in the early centuries of the church. These became popular during the Middle Ages. They were collected in books of hagiography such as the Golden Legend or the works of Caesarius of Heisterbach. These miracle tales made relics much sought-after during the period. By the Late Middle Ages, the collecting of, and dealing in, relics had reached enormous proportions, and had spread from the church to royalty, and then to the nobility and merchant classes.

The Council of Trent of 1563 enjoined bishops to instruct their flocks that "the holy bodies of holy martyrs ... are to be venerated by the faithful, for through these [bodies] many benefits are bestowed by God on men". The Council further insisted that "in the invocation of saints, the veneration of relics and the sacred use of images, every superstition shall be removed and all filthy lucre abolished." There are also many relics associated with Jesus.

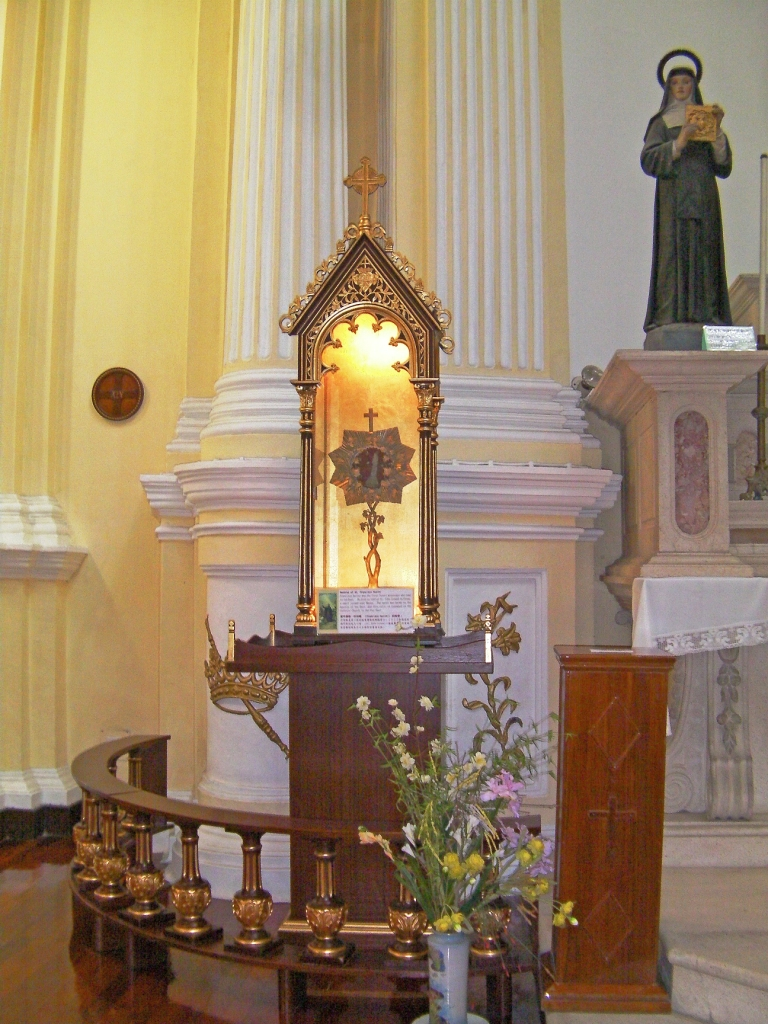
St. Francis Xavier's humerus, St. Joseph's Church, Macau

In his introduction to Gregory's History of the Franks, Ernest Brehaut analyzed the Romano-Christian concepts that gave relics such a powerful draw. He distinguished Gregory's constant usage of sanctus and virtus, the first with its familiar meaning of "sacred" or "holy", and the second as "the mystic potency emanating from the person or thing that is sacred... In a practical way the second word [virtus] ... describes the uncanny, mysterious power emanating from the supernatural and affecting the natural... These points of contact and yielding are the miracles we continually hear of."

=== Relics and pilgrimage ===
Rome became a major destination for Christian pilgrims as it was easier to access for European pilgrims than the Holy Land. Constantine the Great erected great basilicas over the tombs of Saints Peter and Paul. A distinction of these sites was the presence of holy relics. Over the course of the Middle Ages, other religious structures acquired relics and became destinations for pilgrimage. In the eleventh and twelfth centuries, substantial numbers of pilgrims flocked to Santiago de Compostela in Spain, in which the supposed relics of the apostle James, son of Zebedee, discovered c. 830, are housed. Santiago de Compostela remains a significant pilgrimage site, with around 200,000 pilgrims, both secular and Christian, completing the numerous pilgrimage routes to the cathedral in 2012 alone.

By venerating relics through visitation, gifts, and providing services, medieval Christians believed that they would acquire the protection and intercession of the sanctified dead. Relics of local saints drew visitors to sites like Saint Frideswide's in Oxford, and San Nicola Peregrino in Trani. Instead of having to travel to be near to a venerated saint, relics of the saint could be venerated locally.

Believers would make pilgrimages to places believed to have been sanctified by the physical presence of Christ or prominent saints, such as the site of the Holy Sepulchre in Jerusalem.

==== Economic effect ====
As holy relics attracted pilgrims and these religious tourists needed to be housed, fed, and provided with souvenirs, relics became a source of income not only for the destinations that held them, but for the abbeys, churches, and towns en route. Relics were prized as they were portable. They could be possessed, inventoried, bequeathed, stolen, counterfeited, and smuggled. They could add value to an established site or confer significance on a new location. Offerings made at a site of pilgrimage were an important source of revenue for the community who received them on behalf of the saint.

According to Patrick Geary, "[t]o the communities fortunate enough to have a saint's remains in its church, the benefits in terms of revenue and status were enormous, and competition to acquire relics and to promote the local saint's virtues over those of neighboring communities was keen." Local clergy promoted their own patron saints in an effort to secure their own market share. On occasion guards had to watch over mortally ill holy men and women to prevent the unauthorized dismemberment of their corpses as soon as they died. Geary also suggests that the danger of someone murdering an aging holy man in order to acquire his relics was a legitimate concern.

Relics were used to cure the sick, to seek intercession for relief from famine or plague, to take solemn oaths, and to pressure warring factions to make peace in the presence of the sacred. Courts held relics since Merovingian times. St Angilbert acquired for Charlemagne one of the most impressive collections in Christendom. An active market developed and relics entered into commerce along the same trade routes followed by other portable commodities. Matthew Brown likens a ninth-century Italian deacon named Deusdona, with access to the Roman catacombs, as crossing the Alps to visit monastic fairs of northern Europe much like a contemporary art dealer.

Canterbury was a popular destination for English pilgrims, who traveled to witness the miracle-working relics of St Thomas Becket, the sainted Archbishop of Canterbury who was assassinated by knights of King Henry II in 1170. After Becket's death, his successor and the Canterbury chapter quickly used his relics to promote the cult of the as-yet-uncanonized martyr. The motivations included the assertion of the Church's independence against rulers, a desire to have an English (indeed Norman English) saint of European reputation, and the desire to promote Canterbury as a destination for pilgrimage. In the first years after Becket's death, donations at the shrine accounted for twenty-eight percent of the cathedral's total revenues.

=== Counterfeits ===
In the absence of real ways of assessing authenticity, relic-collectors became prey to the unscrupulous, and some extremely high prices were paid. Forgeries proliferated from the very beginning. Augustine already denounced impostors who wandered around disguised as monks, making a profit from the sale of spurious relics. In his Admonitio Generalis of 789, Charlemagne ordered that "the false names of martyrs and the uncertain memorials of saints should not be venerated." The Fourth Lateran Council (1215) of the Catholic Church condemned abuses such as counterfeit relics and exaggerated claims.

Pieces of the True Cross were one of the most highly sought-after of such relics; many churches claimed to possess a piece of it, so many that John Calvin famously remarked that there were enough pieces of the True Cross to build a ship from. By the middle of the 16th century, the number of relics in Christian churches became enormous, and there was practically no possibility to distinguish the authentic from the falsification, since both of them had been in the temples for centuries and were objects for worship. In 1543, John Calvin wrote about fake relics in his Treatise on Relics, in which he described the state of affairs with relics in Catholic churches. Calvin says that the saints have two or three or more bodies with arms and legs, and even a few extra limbs and heads.

Due to the existence of counterfeit relics, the Church began to regulate the use of relics. Canon Law required the authentication of relics if they were to be publicly venerated. They had to be sealed in a reliquary and accompanied by a certificate of authentication, signed and sealed by someone in the Congregation for Saints, or by the local Bishop where the saint lived. Without such authentication, relics are not to be used for public veneration. The Congregation for Saints, as part of the Roman Curia, holds the authority to verify relics in which documentation is lost or missing. The documents and reliquaries of authenticated relics are usually affixed with a wax seal.

=== Classifications and prohibitions in the Catholic Church ===
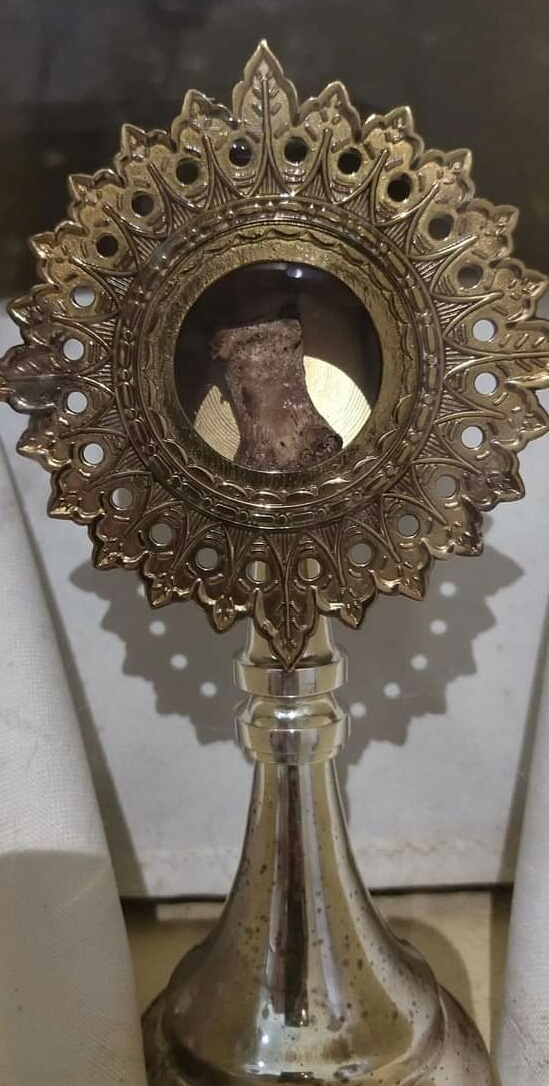
First-class relic of the Servant of God Alfredo F. Verzosa (Ex Ossibus, "from [the] bone")

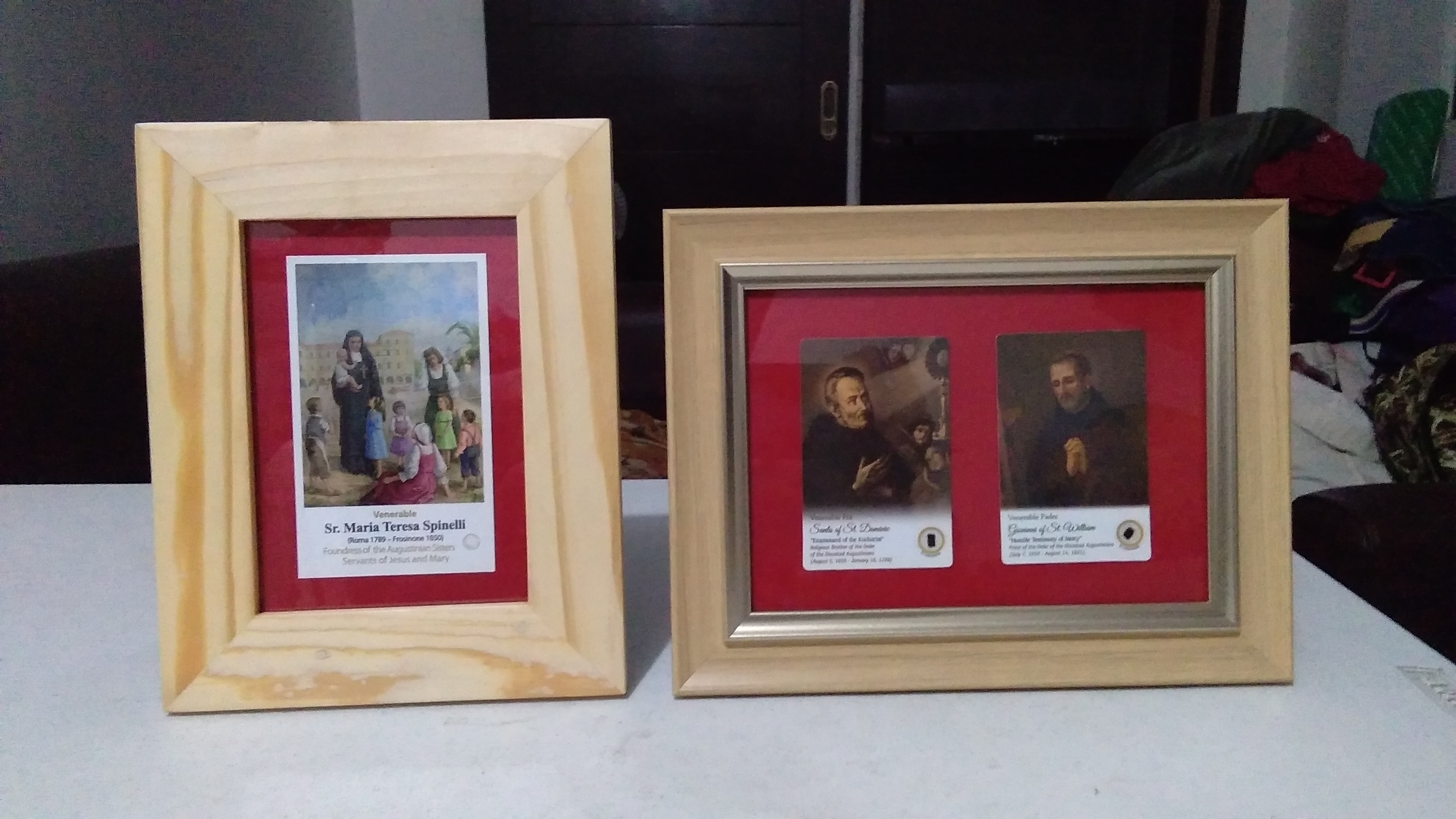
Second-class relics of Venerable Maria Teresa Spinelli, Venerable Santo of St. Dominic, and Venerable Giovanni of St. William (Ex Indumentis)

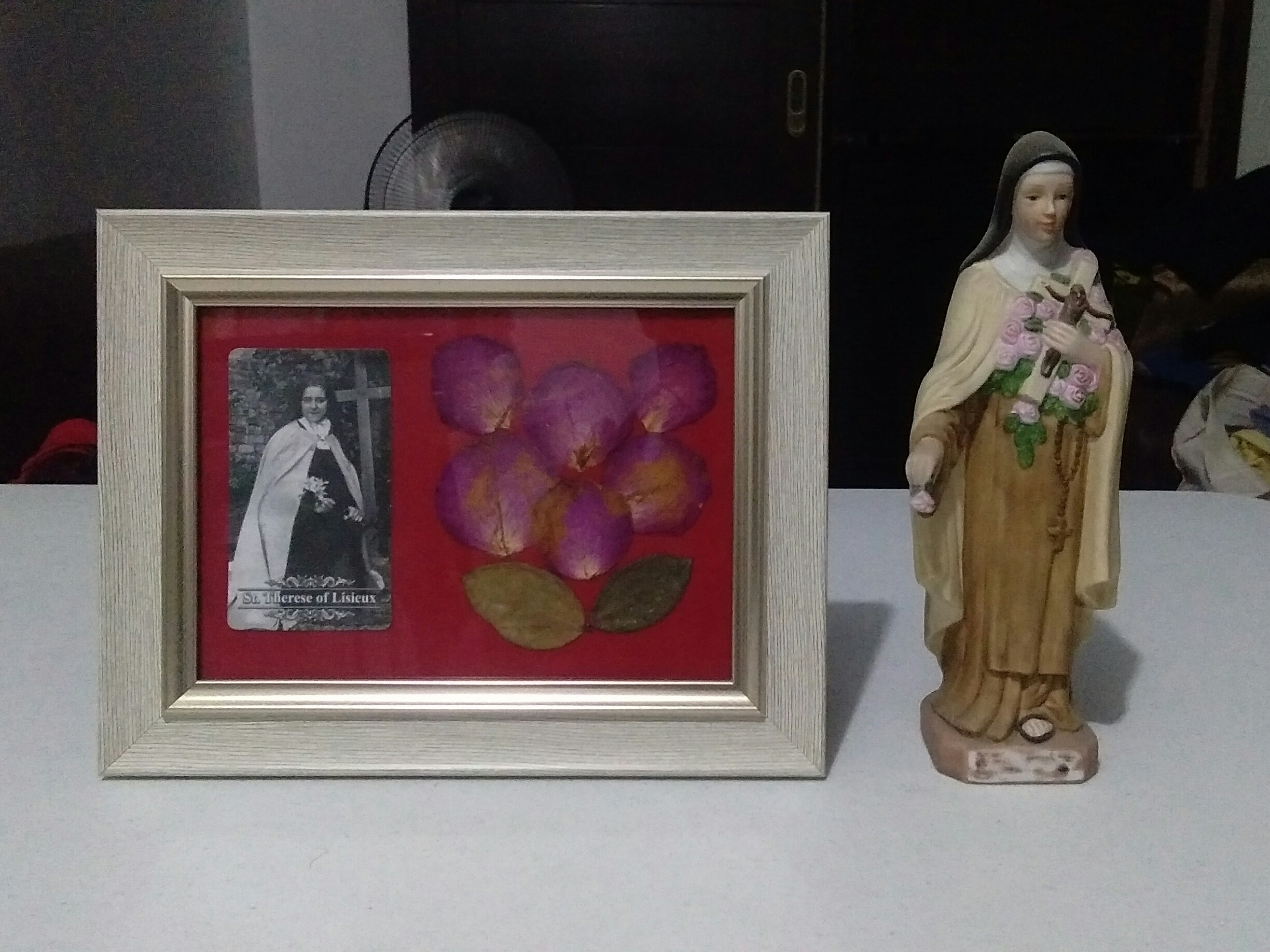
Third-class relic of Saint Therese of Lisieux (Reliqua Tertiae classis)

In Catholic theology, sacred relics must not be worshipped, because only God is worshipped and adored. Instead, the veneration given to them was "dulia". Saint Jerome declared, "We do not worship, we do not adore, for fear that we should bow down to the creature rather than to the Creator, but we venerate the relics of the martyrs in order the better to adore Him whose martyrs they are."

Until 2017, the Catholic Church divided relics into three classes:

- First-class relics: items directly associated with the events of Christ's life (the Manger, True Cross, etc.) or the physical remains of a saint (a bone, a hair, skull, a limb, blood, etc.). Traditionally, a martyr's relics are often more prized than the relics of other saints. Parts of the saint that were significant to their life are also more prized; King St. Stephen of Hungary's right forearm is especially important due to his status as a ruler. A famous theologian's head may be his most important relic; the head of St. Thomas Aquinas was removed by the monks at the Cistercian abbey at Fossanova where he died. If a saint travelled often, then the bones of his feet may be prized. Catholic teaching prohibits relics to be divided up into small, unrecognizable parts if they are to be used in liturgy (i.e., as in an altar; see rubrics listed in Rite of Dedication of a Church and an Altar).
- Second-class relics: items that the saint owned or frequently used, for example, a crucifix, rosary, book, etc. Again, an item more important in the saint's life is thus a more important relic. Sometimes a second-class relic is a part of an item that the saint wore (a shirt, a glove, etc.) and is known as ex indumentis ("from the clothing").
- Third-class relics: any object that has been in contact with a first- or second-class relic. Most third-class relics are small pieces of cloth, though in the first millennium oil was popular; the Monza ampullae contained oil collected from lamps burning before the major sites of Christ's life, and some reliquaries had holes for oil to be poured in and out again. Many people call the cloth touched to the bones of saints "ex brandea". But ex brandea strictly refers to pieces of clothing that were touched to the body or tombs of the apostles. It is a term that is used only for such; it is not a synonym for a third-class relic.

In 2017, the Congregation for the Causes of Saints abolished relics of the third degree, introducing a two-stage scale of classification of relics: significant (insigni) and non-significant (non insigni) relics. The first category includes the bodies or their significant parts, as well as the entire contents of the urn with the ashes preserved after cremation. The second includes small fragments of the bodies, as well as objects used by saints and blesseds.

The sale or disposal by other means of "sacred relics" (meaning first and second class) without the permission of the Apostolic See is now strictly forbidden by canon 1190 of the 1983 Code of Canon Law. However, the Catholic Church permitted the sale of third-class relics. Relics may not be placed upon the altar for public veneration, as that is reserved for the display of the Blessed Sacrament (host or prosphora and Eucharistic wine after consecration in the sacrament of the Eucharist).

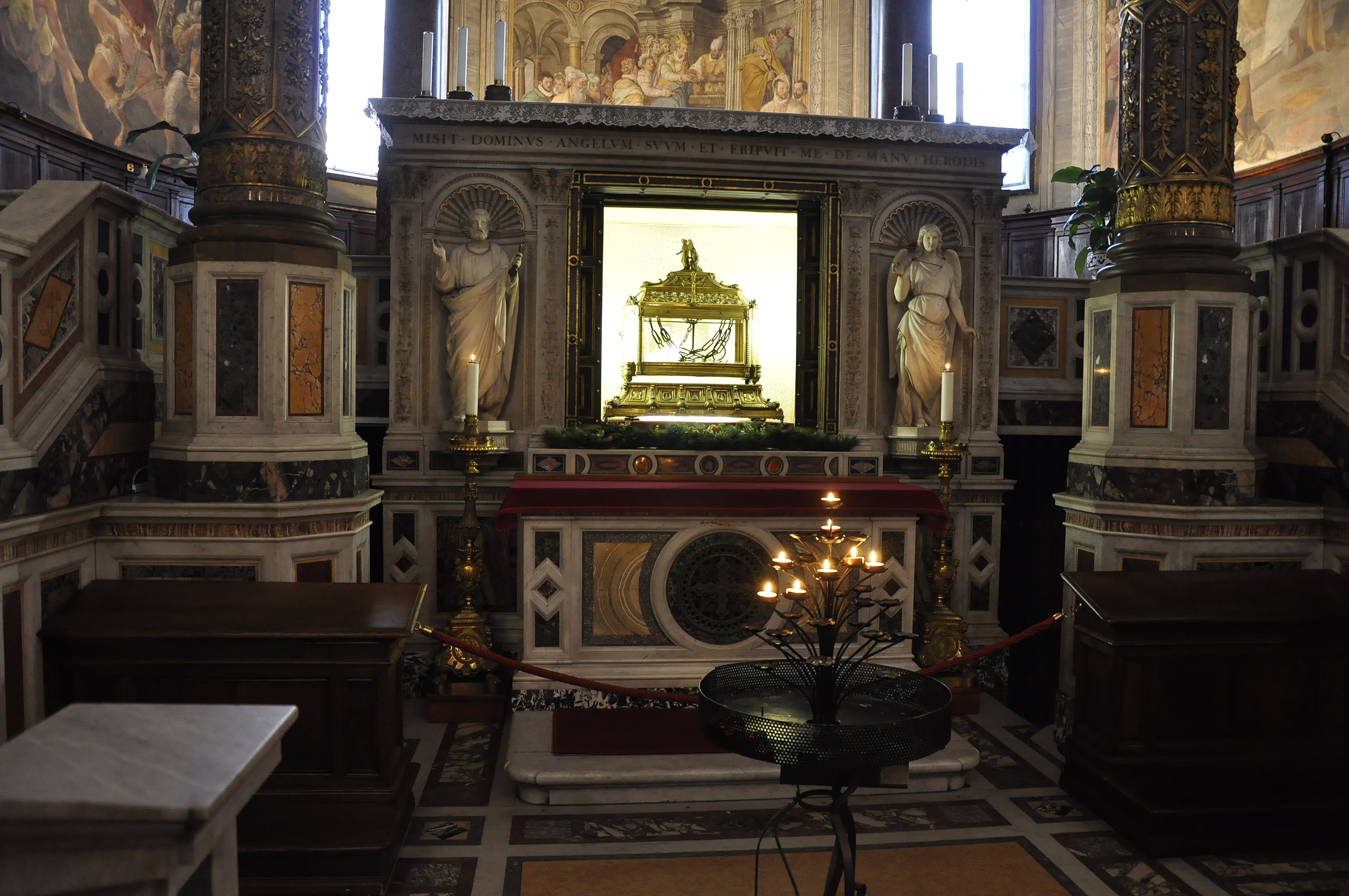
St. Peter's chains, preserved in San Pietro in Vincoli, Rome, a second-class relic

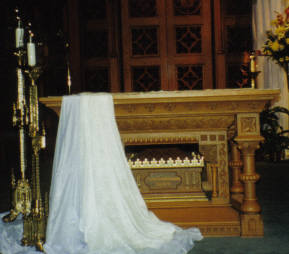
Main Altar of St. Raphael's Cathedral, Dubuque, Iowa, containing the remains of Saint Cessianus, a boy martyred during the Diocletianic Persecution

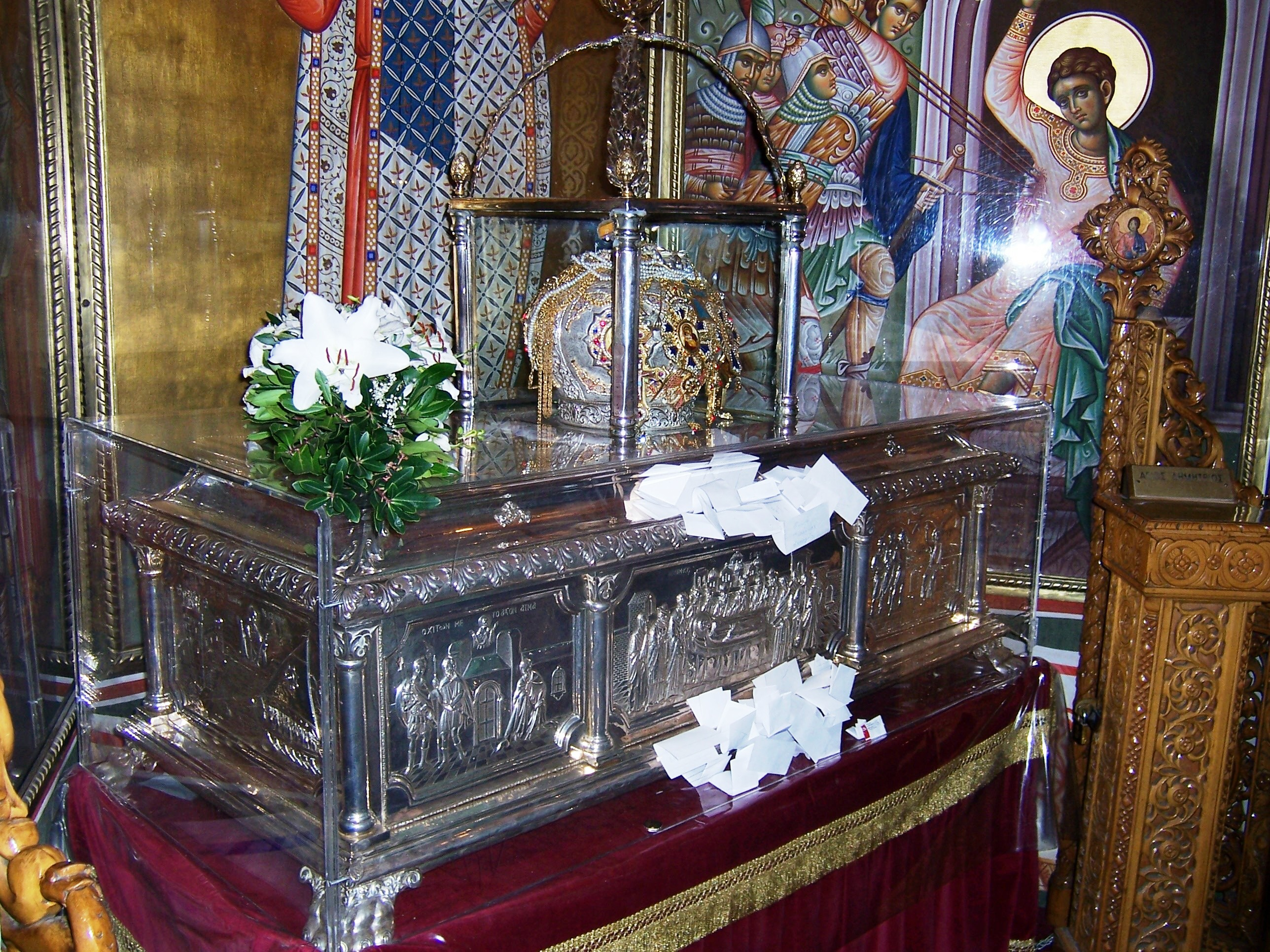
Relics of St. Demetrius in the cathedral of Thessalonika, Greece

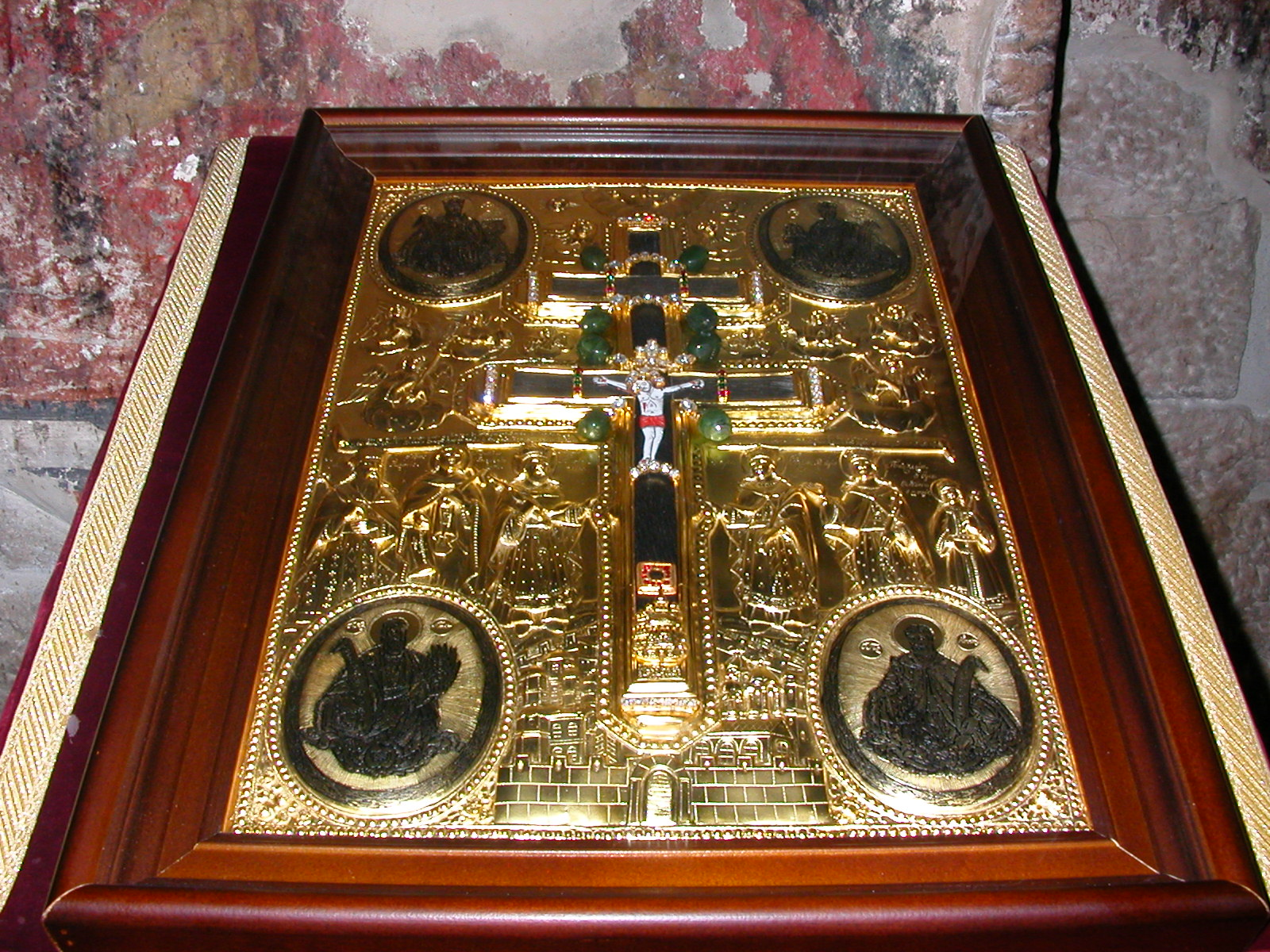
Relic of the True Cross, Decani Monastery, Serbia

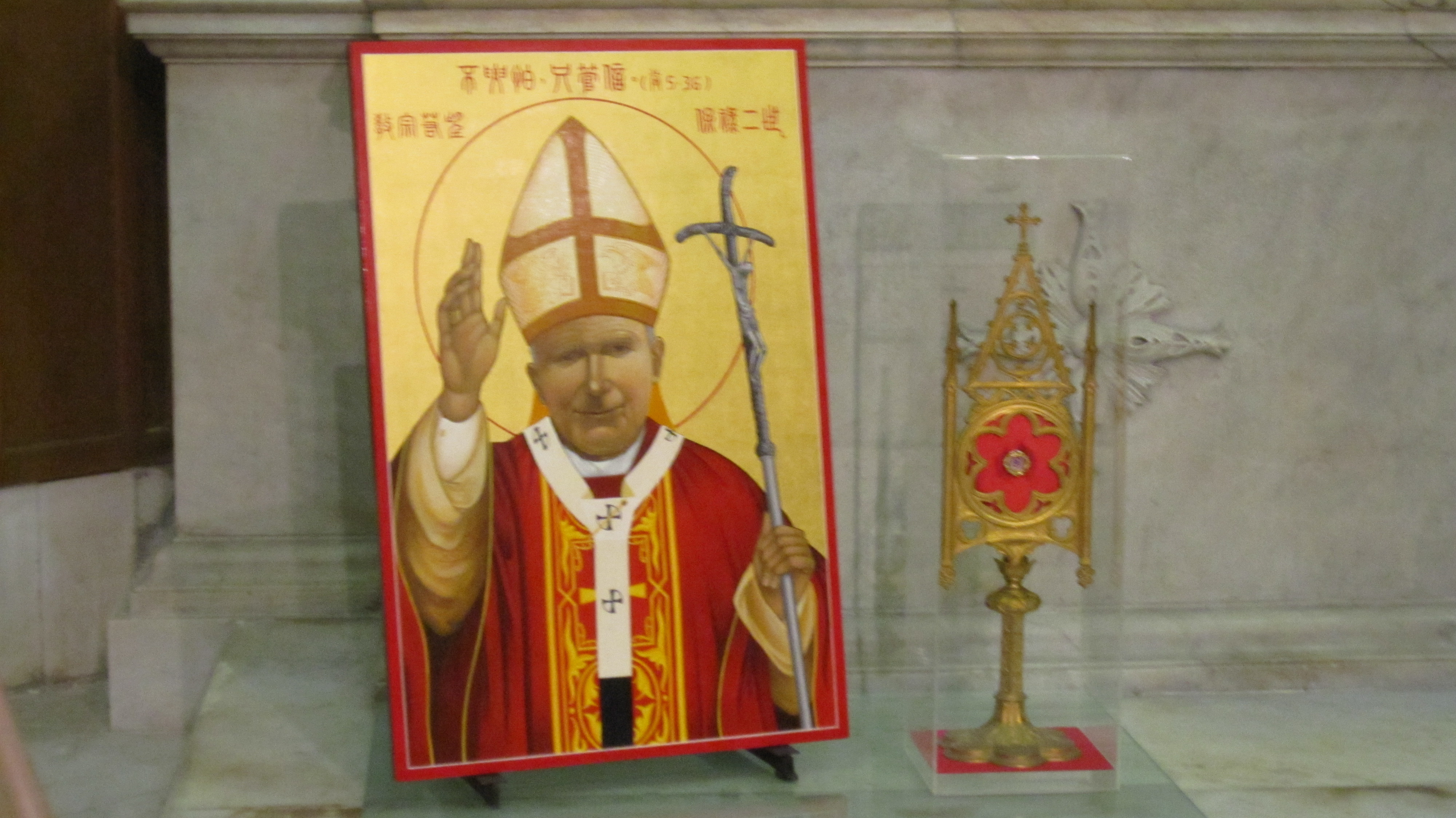
Relic of Pope St. John Paul II, declared a saint in 2014, in the Hong Kong Catholic Cathedral of the Immaculate Conception

=== Evangelical-Lutheranism ===
After the Reformation, all of the dioceses in the Nordic-Baltic region became inherited by the Evangelical-Lutheran Churches. Among the Evangelical-Lutheran churches that house relics, the relics are viewed as not having any power in and of themselves, but as a legacy of the saints that are honored in the Evangelical-Lutheran Churches (cf. Calendar of saints (Lutheran)). In the Evangelical-Lutheran Church of Sweden, the Feast Day of Saint Erik is celebrated on May 18. The liturgy at Uppsala Cathedral concludes with the congregation moving into the side chapel to venerate his relics.

The high church Evangelical-Lutheran Societas Sanctae Birgittae celebrates the Feast Day of Saint Bridget of Sweden on July 23. The relics of Saint Bridget at Vadstena Abbey are venerated by Evangelical-Lutherans belonging to the Church of Sweden, along with Roman Catholics.

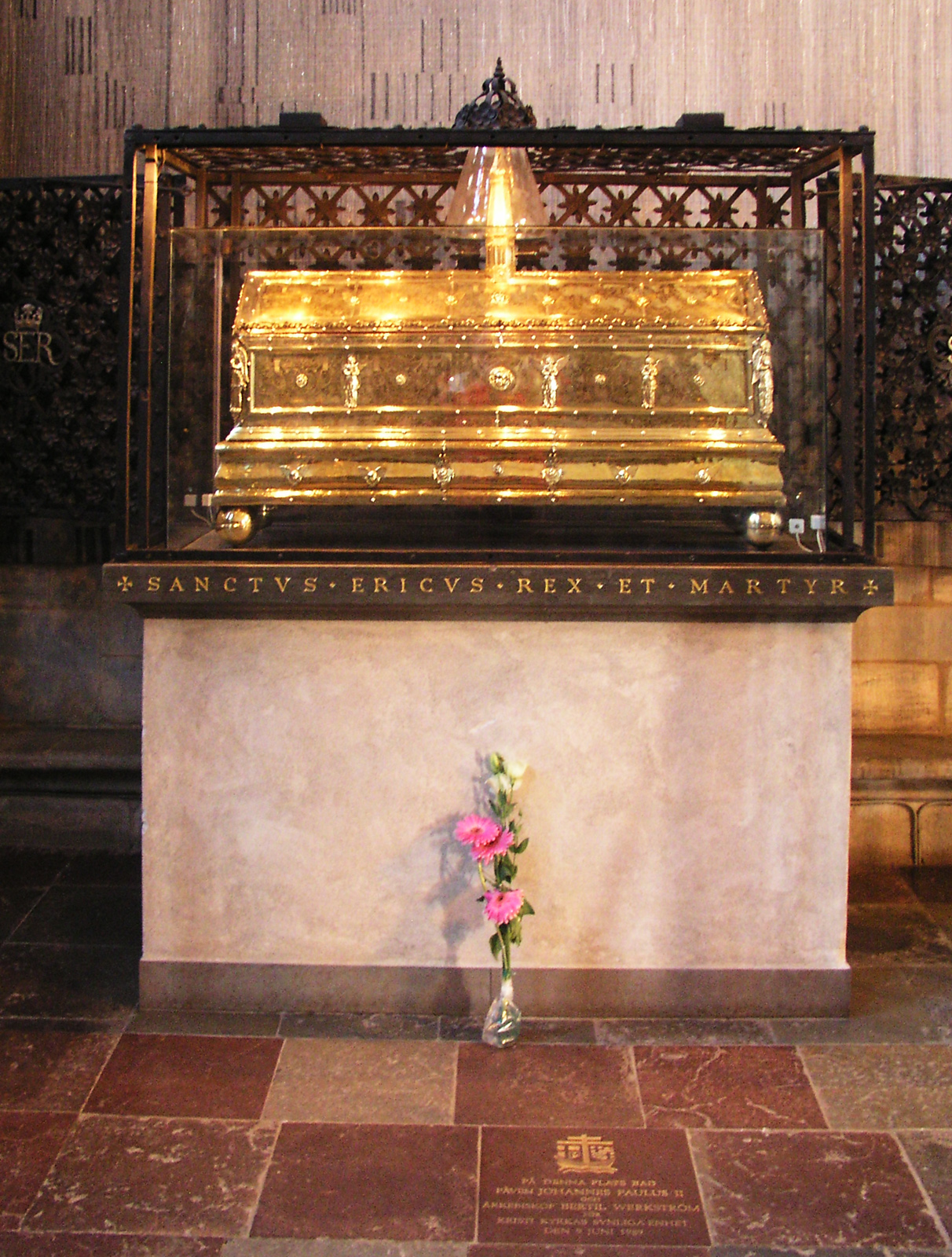
The reliquary of Saint Erik at Uppsala Evangelical-Lutheran Cathedral

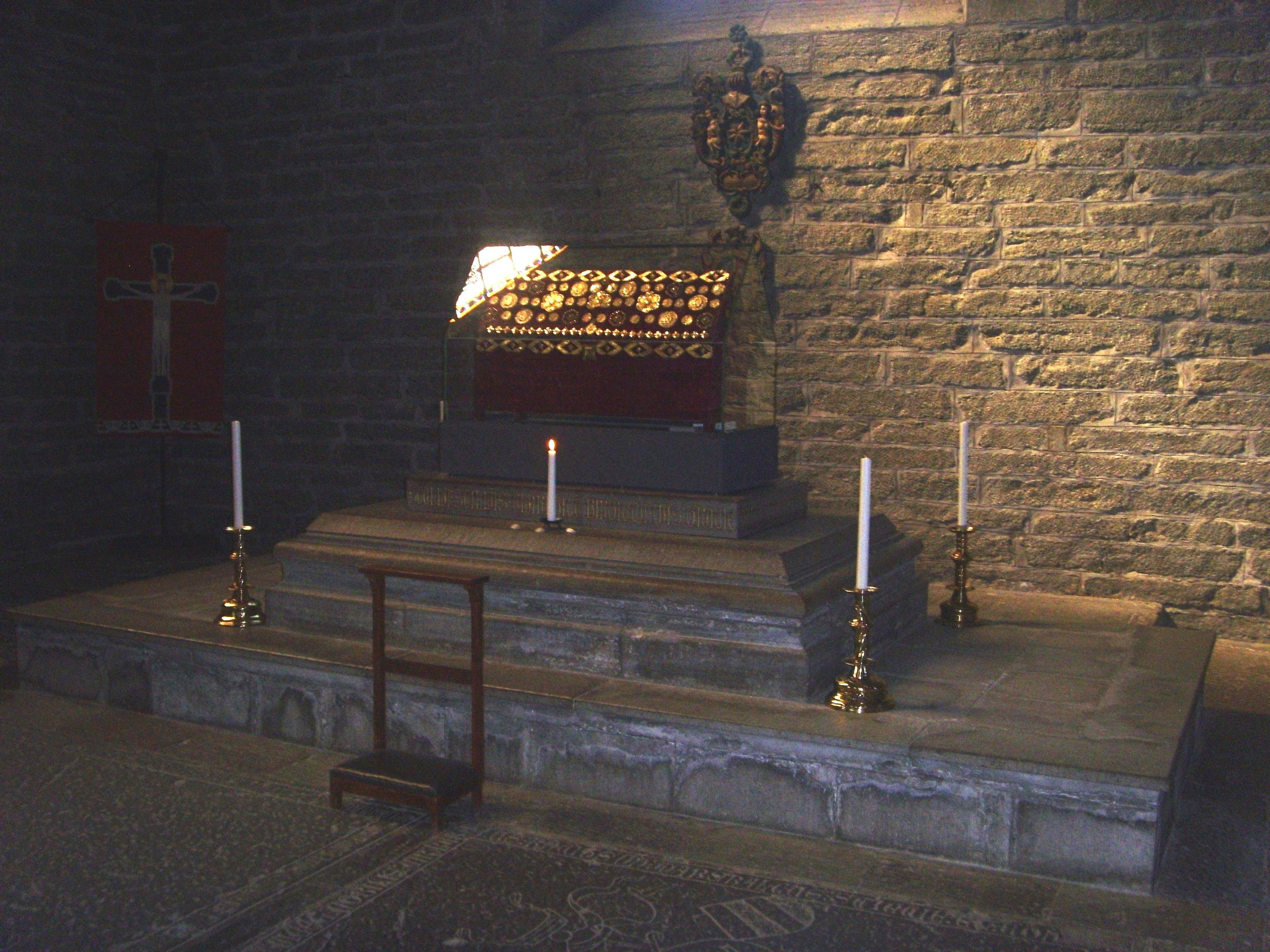
The casket of Saint Bridget of Sweden at Vadstena Abbey is venerated by Evangelical-Lutherans and Roman Catholics

=== Eastern Orthodoxy ===
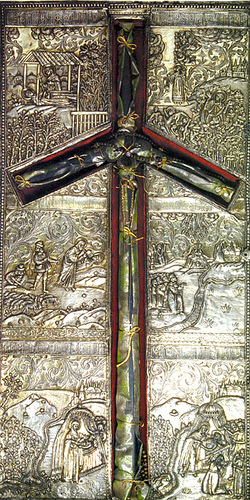
Grapevine cross of Saint Nino of Georgia (Sioni Cathedral, Tbilisi, Georgia)

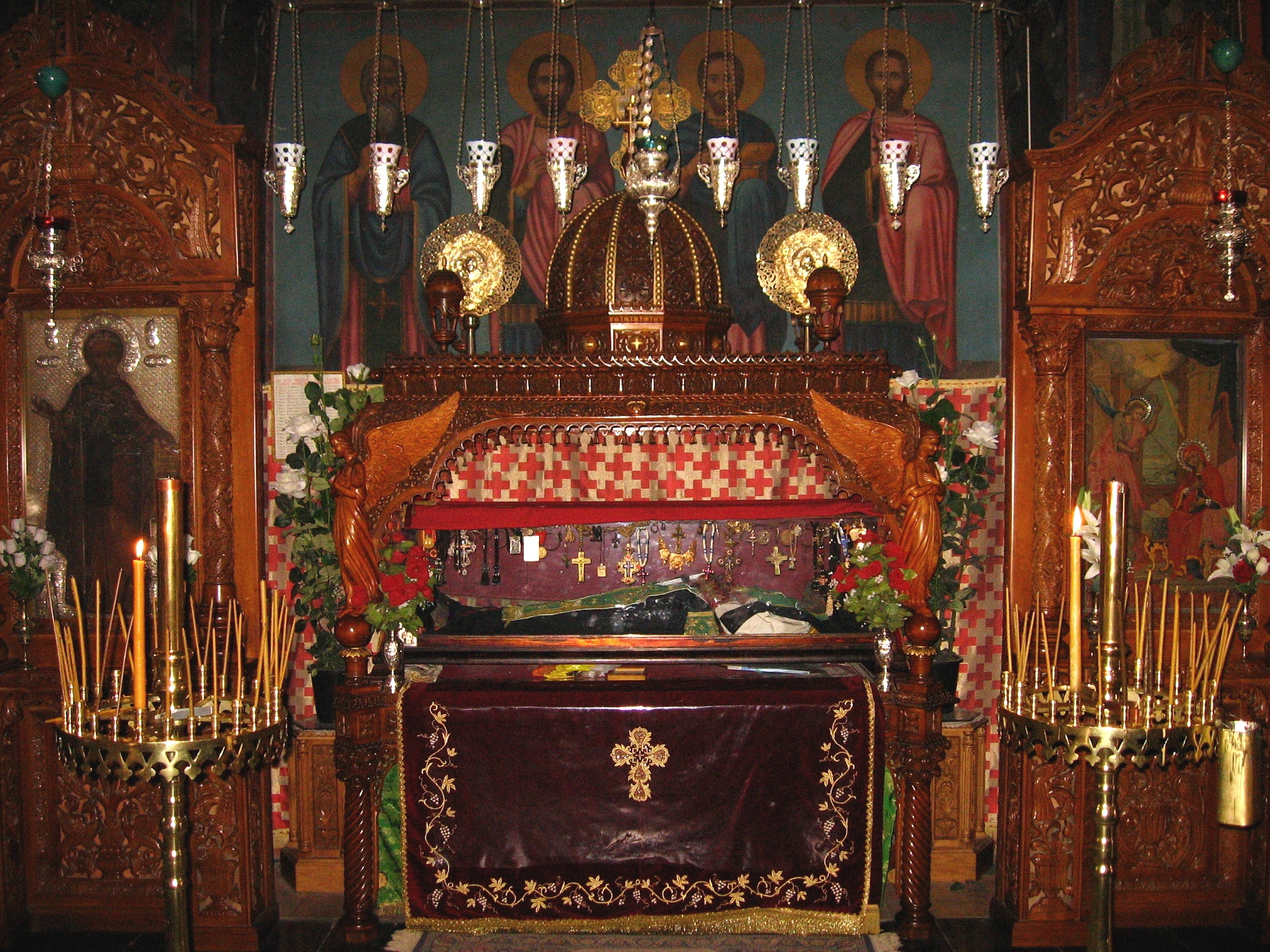
Relics of Saint Sabbas the Sanctified in the Catholicon of Mar Saba Monastery in the Kidron Valley

The importance of relics in the Byzantine world can be seen from the veneration given to the pieces of the True Cross. Many great works of Byzantine enamel are staurothekes, or relics containing fragments of the True Cross. Other significant relics included the girdle worn by the Virgin, and pieces of the body or clothing of saints. Such relics (called contact relics, or secondary relics) were, however, scarce and did not provide most believers with ready access to proximity to the holy. The growth in the production and popularity of reproducible contact relics in the fifth and sixth centuries testifies to the need felt for more widespread access to the divine.

These contact relics usually involved the placing of readily available objects, such as pieces of cloth, clay tablets, or water then bottled for believers, in contact with a relic. Alternatively, such objects could be dipped into water which had been in contact with the relic (such as the bone of a saint). These relics, a firmly embedded part of veneration by this period, increased the availability of access to the divine but were not infinitely reproducible (an original relic was required), and still usually required believers to undertake pilgrimage or have contact with somebody who had.

The earliest recorded removal, or translation of saintly remains was that of Saint Babylas at Antioch in 354, but, partly perhaps because Constantinople lacked the many saintly graves of Rome, they soon became common in the Eastern Empire, though still prohibited in the West. The Eastern capital was therefore able to acquire the remains of Saints Timothy, Andrew and Luke, and the division of bodies also began, the 5th century theologian Theodoretus declaring that "Grace remains entire with every part." In the West, a decree of Theodosius only allowed the moving of a whole sarcophagus with its contents, but the upheavals of the barbarian invasions relaxed the rules, as remains needed to be relocated to safer places.

The veneration of relics continues to be of importance in the Eastern Orthodox Church. As a natural outgrowth of the concept in Orthodox theology of theosis, the physical bodies of the saints are considered to be transformed by divine grace—indeed, all Orthodox Christians are considered to be sanctified by living the mystical life of the Church, and especially by receiving the Sacred Mysteries (Sacraments). In the Orthodox service books, the remains of the departed faithful are referred to as "relics", and are treated with honour and respect. For this reason, the bodies of Orthodox Christians are traditionally not embalmed.

The veneration of the relics of the saints is of great importance in Orthodoxy, and very often churches will display the relics of saints prominently. In a number of monasteries, particularly those on the semi-autonomous Mount Athos in Greece, all of the relics the monastery possesses are displayed and venerated each evening at Compline. As with the veneration of icons, the veneration (Greek; δουλια, dulia) of relics in the Orthodox Church is clearly distinguished from adoration (λατρεια, latria); i.e., that worship which is due to God alone. Thus Orthodox teaching warns the faithful against idolatry and at the same time remains true to scriptural teaching (vis. 2 Kings 13:20–21) as understood by Orthodox Sacred Tradition.

The examination of the relics is an important step in the glorification (canonization) of new saints. Sometimes, one of the interpreted signs of sanctification is the belief that relics of a saint exhibit some special conditions. It has often been claimed that some saints are incorrupt, meaning that their remains do not decay under conditions when they normally should (natural mummification is not the same as incorruption). It is claimed that sometimes after the flesh decays, the bones themselves will manifest signs of sanctity, such as being honey-coloured or giving off a sweet aroma. There are some claims that relics exude myrrh. The absence of such manifestations, however, does not necessarily deter the belief that a person is a Saint.

Relics play a major role in the consecration of a church. The consecrating bishop will place the relics on a diskos (paten) in a church near the church that is to be consecrated, they will then be taken in a cross procession to the new church, carried three times around the new structure and then placed in the Holy Table (altar) as part of the consecration service.

The relics of saints (traditionally, always those of a martyr) are also sewn into the antimension which is given to a priest by his bishop as a means of bestowing faculties upon him (i.e., granting him permission to celebrate the Sacred Mysteries). The antimens is kept on the Holy Table (altar), and it is forbidden to celebrate the Divine Liturgy (Eucharist) without it. Occasionally, in cases of fixed altars, the relics are built in the altar table itself and sealed with a special mixture called wax-mastic.

The necessity of provide relics for antimensions in new churches often necessitates continuous division of relics. An account of this process can be found in a treatise of the pre-revolutionary Russian church historian Nikolay Romansky. According to Romansky, the Holy Synod of the Russian Orthodox Church operated a special office, located in the Church of Philip the Apostle in the Moscow Kremlin, where bones of numerous saints, authenticated by the church's hierarchs, were stored, and pieces of them were prayerfully separated with hammer and chisel to be sent to the dioceses that needed to place them into new antimensions.

=== In art ===
Many churches were built along pilgrimage routes. A number in Europe were either founded or rebuilt specifically to enshrine relics, (such as San Marco in Venice) and to welcome and awe the large crowds of pilgrims who came to seek their help. Romanesque buildings developed passageways behind the altar to allow for the creation of several smaller chapels designed to house relics. From the exterior, this collection of small rooms is seen as a cluster of delicate, curved roofs at one end of the church, a distinctive feature of many Romanesque churches. Gothic churches featured lofty, recessed porches which provided space for statuary and the display of relics.

Historian and philosopher of art Hans Belting observed that in medieval painting, images explained the relic and served as a testament to its authenticity. In Likeness and Presence, Belting argued that the cult of relics helped to stimulate the rise of painting in medieval Europe.

==== Reliquaries ====
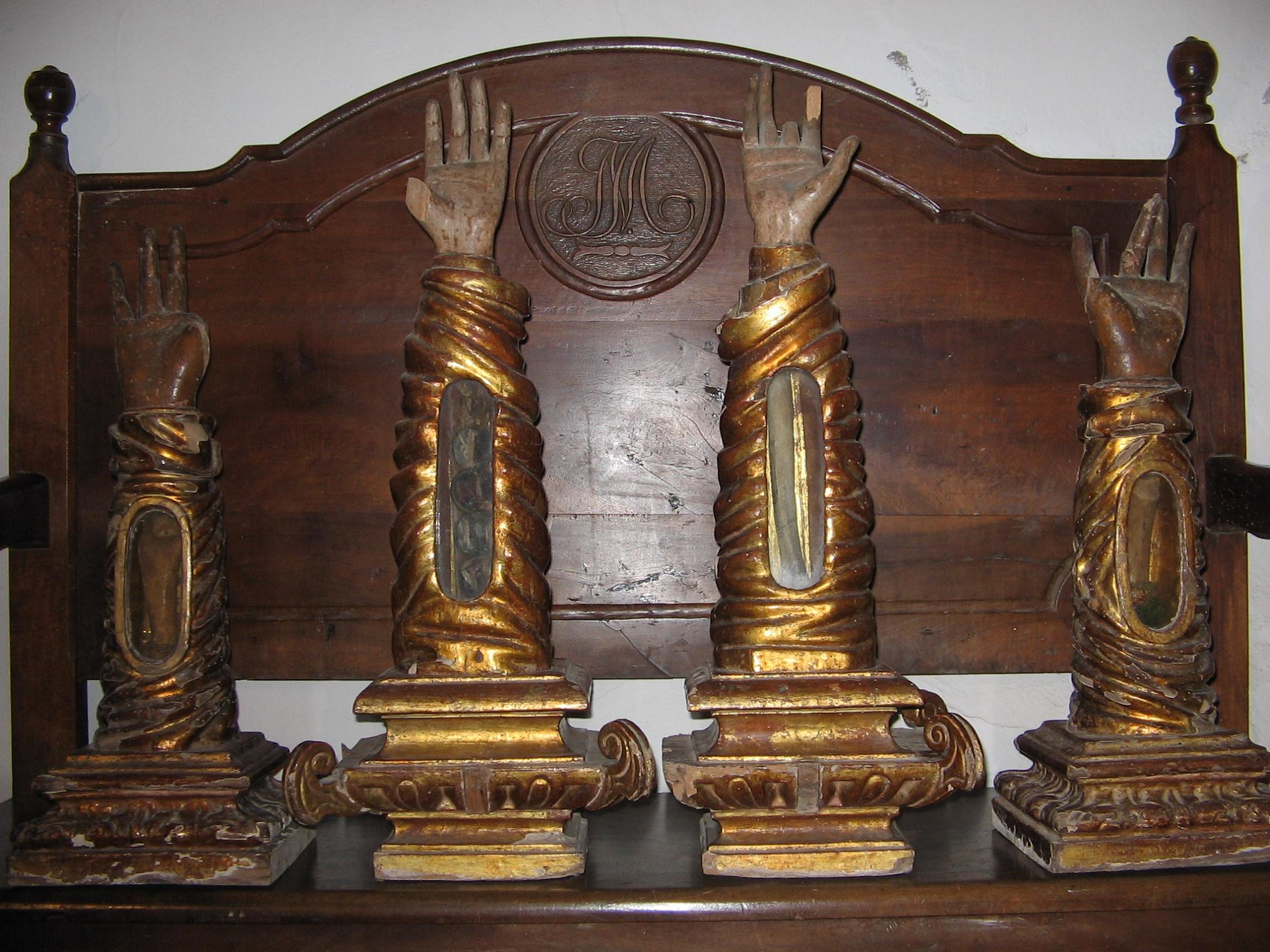
Reliquaries in the Church of San Pedro, in Ayerbe, Spain

Reliquaries are containers used to protect and display relics. While frequently taking the form of caskets, they have many other forms, including simulations of the relic encased within (e.g., a gilded depiction of an arm for a relic consisting of arm bones). Since the relics themselves were considered valuable, they were enshrined in containers crafted of or covered with gold, silver, gems, and enamel.

Ivory was widely used in the Middle Ages for reliquaries, its pure white color an indication of the holy status of its contents. These objects constituted a major form of artistic production across Europe and Byzantium throughout the Middle Ages.

=== List of claimed relics ===
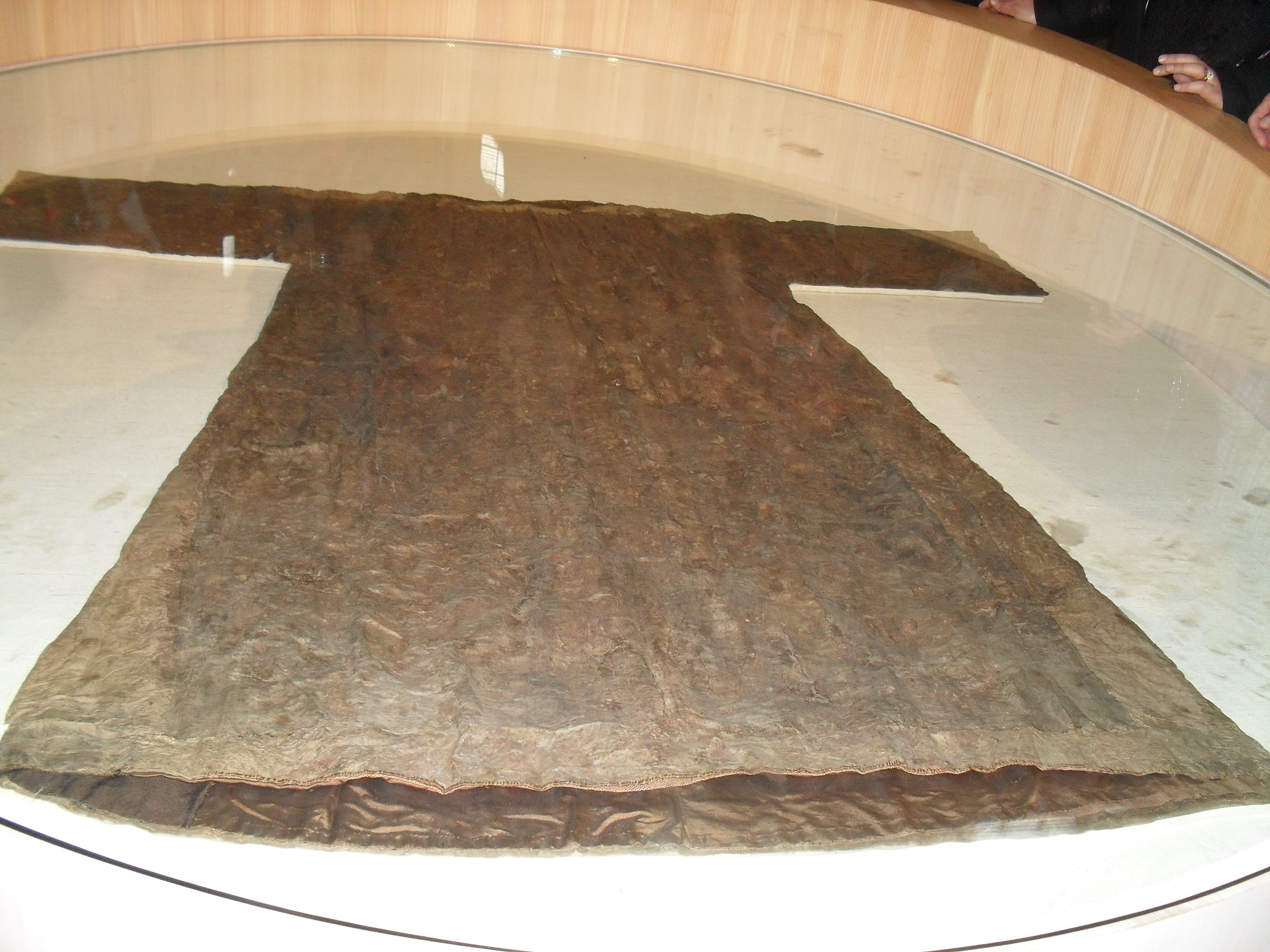
The Seamless robe of Jesus in Trier Cathedral

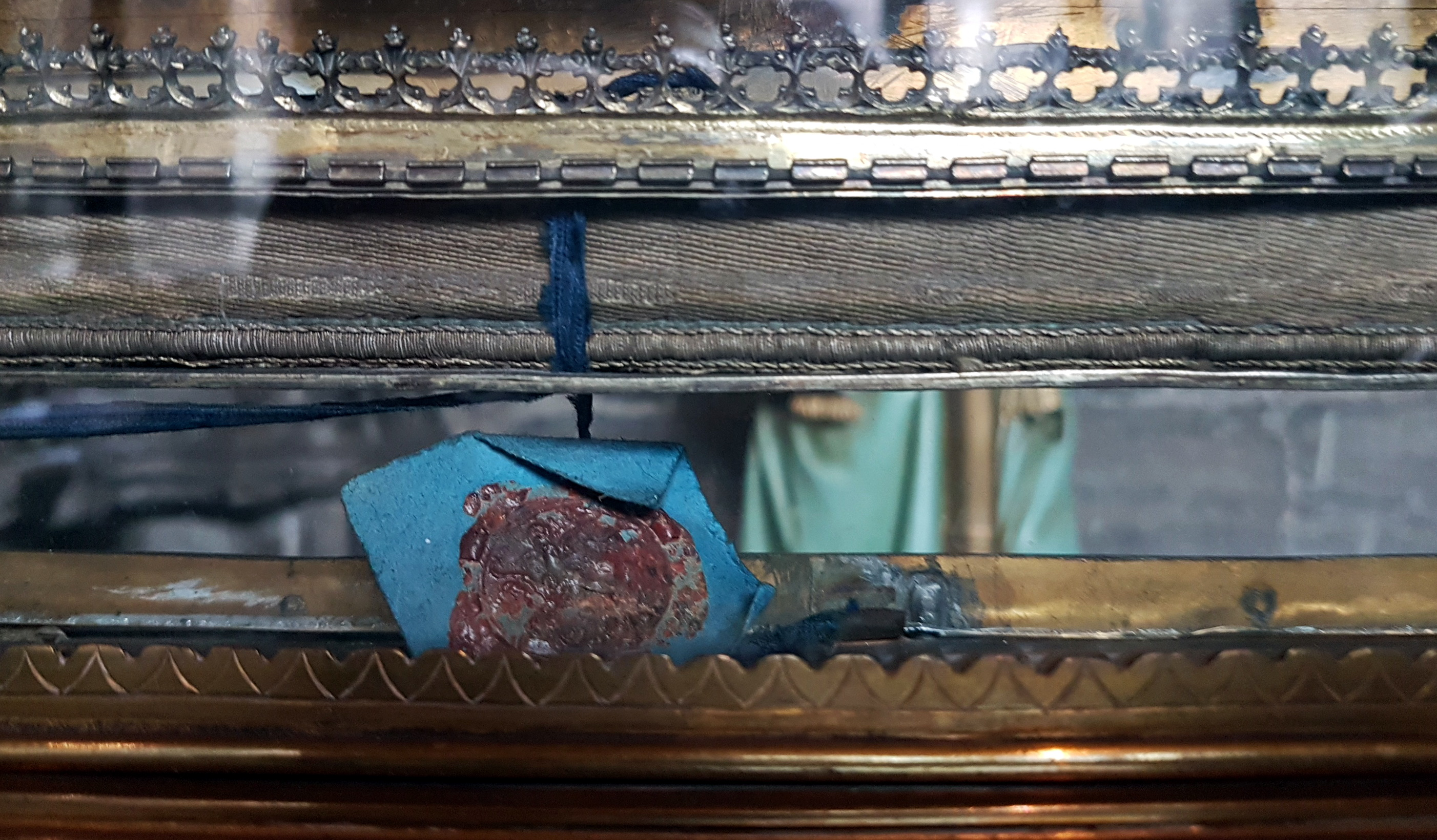
Detail of the Girdle of Mary in the Basilica of Our Lady in Maastricht

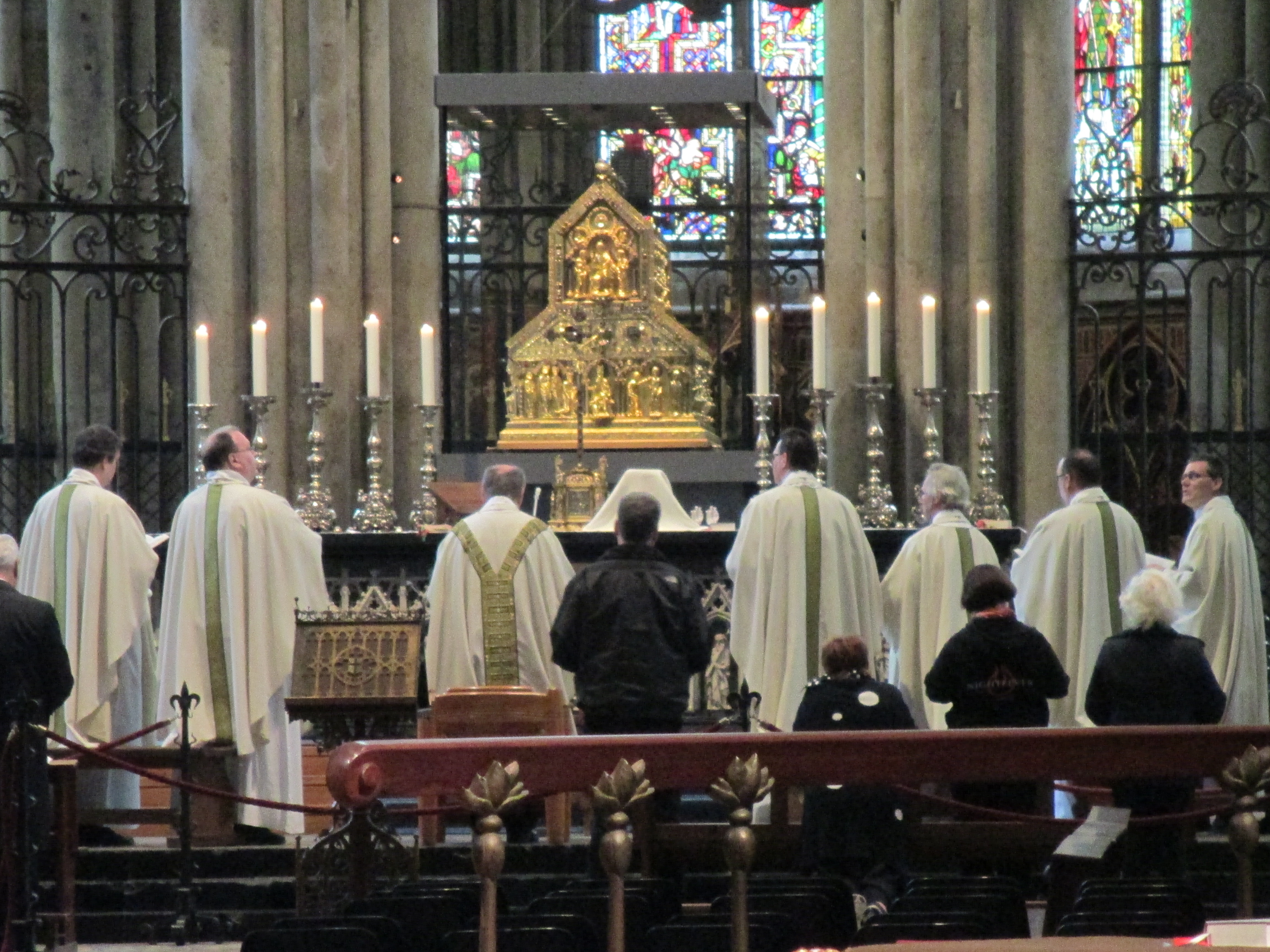
The Shrine of the Three Kings in Cologne Cathedral

- Relics of the True Cross of Jesus are claimed by many churches around the world. The same applies to Holy Nails, Holy Sponges, Holy Lances, Holy Thorns and other Instruments of the Passion. Famous examples are the Holy Nail in the Iron Crown of Lombardy in Monza Cathedral, the Holy Lance that was part of the Crown Jewels of the Holy Roman Empire in the Hofburg Palace in Vienna, and the Holy Thorn Reliquary in the British Museum in London.
- The Seamless robe of Jesus is kept in a purpose-built chapel in Trier Cathedral.
- The Sandals of Jesus Christ were donated to Prüm Abbey, Germany, by popes Zachary and Stephen II in the 8th century.
- The Marienschrein in Aachen Cathedral contains four important relics: the nappy and loin cloth of Jesus, the dress of Mary and the decapitation cloth of John the Baptist. The Karlsschrein in the same church contains the remains of Charlemagne, who was locally venerated as a saint.
- The Girdle of Mary is kept in the Basilica of Our Lady in Maastricht, Netherlands.
- The Shrine of the Three Kings in Cologne Cathedral contains the remnants of the biblical Magi.
- St Peter's Basilica in the Vatican contains Saint Peter's relics.
- St Paul's relics are allegedly contained in the Basilica of Saint Paul Outside the Wall, in Rome.
- St James' relics are reputedly held at the Cathedral of Santiago de Compostela, Spain.
- St Luke the Evangelist's body is held at the Abbey of Santa Giustina in Padua, Italy; his head, in the St. Vitus Cathedral in Prague; and a rib, at his tomb in Thebes, Greece.
- St Mark the Evangelist's relics are held at St Mark's Basilica in Venice.
- St Matthew the Evangelist's relics are purported to be in the Cathedral of Salerno, Italy.
- St John the Evangelist's tomb is purported to be in the Basilica of St. John at Ephesus in Turkey. The opening of his tomb during Constantine the Great's reign yielded no bones, giving rise to the belief that his body was assumed into heaven.
- John the Baptist's skull, or parts of it, are venerated at the Amiens Cathedral in France, at the Church of San Silvestre in Capite in Rome and at the Munich Residenz Palace. His other relics were discovered in a Bulgarian monastery in 2010.
- St Andrew's relics are contained in the Basilica of St Andrew in Patras, Greece.
- Reliquary arms of Saint Thomas the Apostle can be found in churches around the globe. Most contain only a fragment of the arm that allegedly touched Christ's side wound after the Resurrection.
- Saint Thomas Aquinas' relics are contained in the Church of the Jacobins, Toulouse, France.
- Saint Francis of Assisi's relics are enshrined in the Basilica of Saint Francis in Assisi, Italy.
- Saint Catherine of Siena's head is stored in San Domenico church, Siena, with her body in Santa Maria sopra Minerva Church in Rome.
- Saint George's arm is kept in Lod.
- Saint Servatius' relics are largely kept in a gilded chest and bust in the Basilica of Saint Servatius in Maastricht, Netherlands. Some of his relics are in Tongeren, Belgium, and Quedlinburg, Germany.
- Saint Lambert's skull is contained in a reliquary bust in Liège Cathedral, Belgium.
- Saint Hubert's remains were enshrined in the Abbey of Saint-Hubert, Belgium.
- Saint Willibrord's remains are in Echternach, Luxemburg.
- Nun Maria Droste zu Vischering's (known as Mary of the Divine Heart) relics are exposed in the Church of the Sacred Heart of Jesus in Ermesinde, Portugal.
- The shin of Pope Saint Clement I is kept in the Church of the Conception of Santa Cruz de Tenerife, Spain.

=== Feast days ===
In the Extraordinary Form of the Catholic Church, the Feast of the Holy Relics is celebrated on 5 November, within the Octave of All Saints Day. In the Melkite Greek Catholic Church, the Second Sunday of Great Lent is the Sunday of the Holy Relics and Saint Gregory Palamas.

== Hinduism ==
In Hinduism, relics are less common than in other religions since the physical remains of most saints are cremated. The veneration of corporal relics may have originated with the śramaṇa movement or the appearance of Buddhism, and burial practices became more common after the Muslim invasions. One prominent example is the preserved body of Swami Ramanuja in a separate shrine inside Srirangam Temple. Another one is the worship of the triad of Jagannath, Balabhadra and Subhadra at the Jagannath Temple, Puri, Odisha, India.

== Islam ==
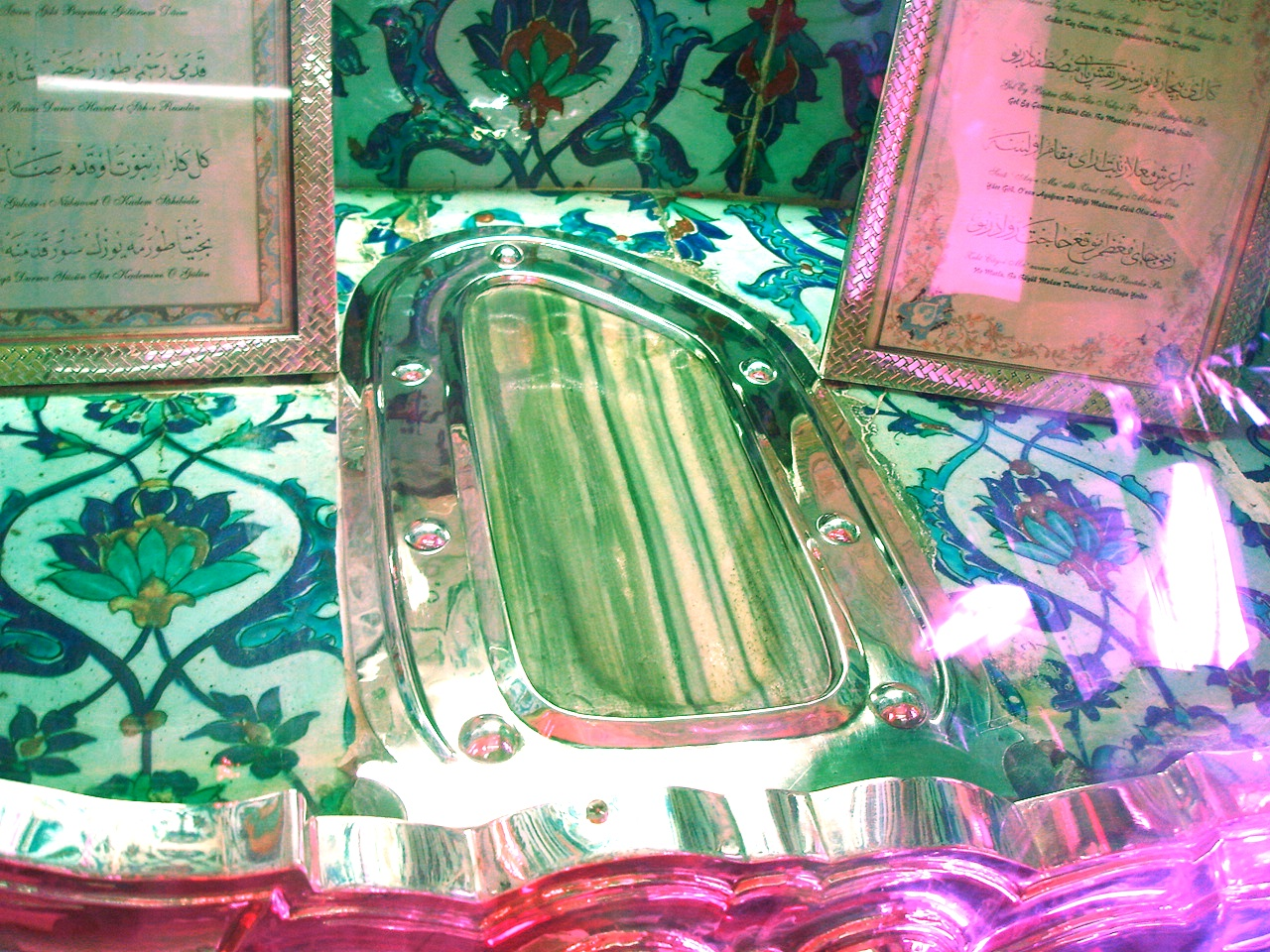
Footprint of the Islamic prophet Muhammad, preserved in the türbe (funerary mausoleum) in Eyüp, Istanbul

The veneration of the relics of saints became an incredibly important part of devotional piety in both Sunni and Shia Islam throughout the classical and medieval periods, with "the ubiquity of relics and ritual practices associated with them" becoming a mainstay of "the devotional life of the Muslims ... [all over the world but particularly in] the Near East and North Africa." With the latter-day influence of the reformist movements of Salafism and Wahhabism, there is, according to some scholars, an erroneous perception which persists both among some modern Muslims and Western observers opining that "the Islamic experience['s relationship with relic-veneration] is marginal, because of the perceived absence of relics in Islam." It is, however, evident that "the historical reality of relics in Islam" was very different, and that the classical Islamic thinkers posed various reasons for why the veneration of the relics of prophets and saints was permissible.

=== Relics of the prophets ===
==== In Istanbul ====
While various relics are preserved by different Muslim communities, the most important are those known as The Sacred Trusts, more than 600 pieces treasured in the Privy Chamber of the Topkapı Palace Museum in Istanbul.

Muslims believe that these treasures include:

- Hair from Prophet Muhammad's beard and footprint
- Sword of Ali
- Sword of David
- Turban of Joseph
- Staff of Moses
- Pot of Abraham
- Forearm and hand of Yahya (John the Baptist)

Most of the trusts can be seen in the museum, but the most important of them can only be seen during the month of Ramadan. The Qur'an has been recited next to these relics uninterruptedly since they were brought to the Topkapı Palace, but Muslims do not worship these relics.

==== Sacred Cloak of the Prophet ====
A cloak (kherqa) believed to have belonged to the prophet Mohammed is kept in the central mosque in Kandahar, Afghanistan. According to local history, it was given to Ahmad Shah by Mured Beg, the Emir of Bokhara. The Sacred Cloak is kept locked away, taken out only at times of great crisis. In 1996 Mullah Omar, leader of the Afghan Taliban, took it out, displayed it to a crowd of ulema (religious scholars) and was declared Amir-ul Momineen ("Commander of the Faithful"). Prior to this, the last time it had been removed had been when the city was struck by a cholera epidemic in the 1930s.

== Cultural relics ==
Relic is also the term for something that has survived the passage of time, especially an object or custom whose original culture has disappeared, but also an object cherished for historical or memorial value (such as a keepsake or heirloom).

"Cultural relic" is a common translation for wenwu (文物), a common Chinese word that usually means "antique" but can be extended to anything, including object and monument, that is of historical and cultural value. However, this has some issues since the term wenwu has little resemblance to the English usage of "relic". In most cases, "artifact", "archaeological site", "monument", or just plain "archaeology" would be a better translation.

== In fiction ==
- The Relic by Eça de Queiroz, Dedalus Ltd, UK 1994. ISBN 0-946626-94-4
- The Translation of Father Torturo by Brendan Connell, Prime Books, 2005. ISBN 0-8095-0043-4

== See also ==
- Catacomb saints
- Hazratbal Shrine
- Relick Sunday
- Relics associated with Buddha
- Relics associated with Jesus
- Shrine of the Three Kings
- Translation (relic)
