= George Portwood =

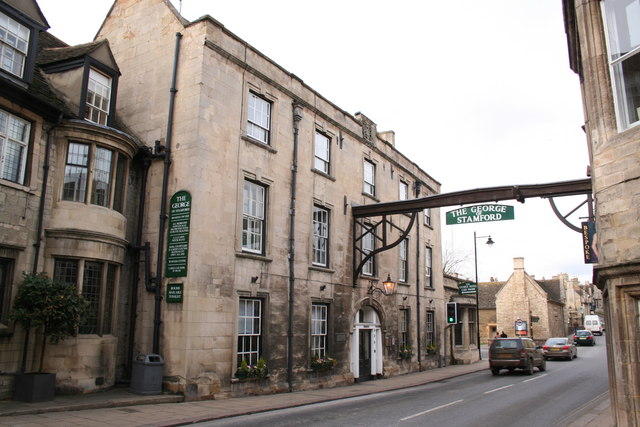
- The George Hotel, Stamford. Refaced by Portwood in 1724
- Died: 3 May 1742 ?Stamford, Lincolnshire
- Occupation: Architect
- Projects: Work for the 8th Earl of Exeter in Stamford.

George Portwood (died c.1744) was a carpenter and architect who worked in Stamford. He was Chamberlain of Stamford in 1736 and Mayor of Stamford.

== Work by George Portwood ==
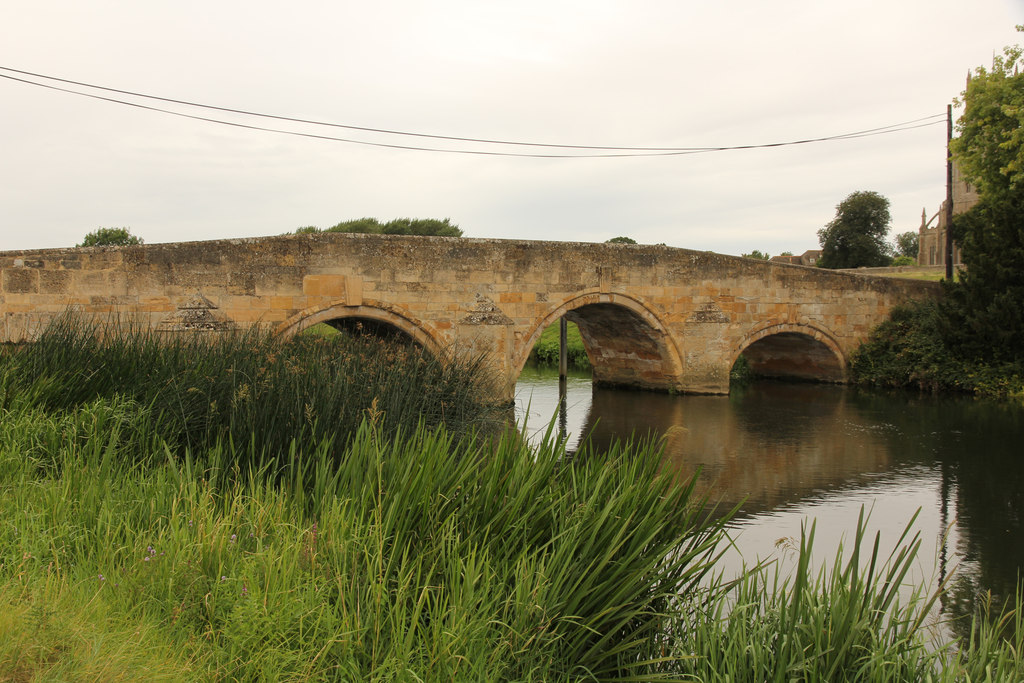
Fotheringhay Bridge

- Bridge over the River Nene at Fotheringhay 1722.
- Took down the ruinous steeple of Pickworth Church, Rutland
- George Hotel, Stamford refronted in 1724 by George Portwood, and further alterations and repairs were carried out between then and 1726.
- Bridge at Woodnewton, Northamptonshire, 1735 (now demolished).
- Rebuilt Braunston Church Tower, Rutland.
- Witham on the Hill Church, Lincoln (1737). The tower and steeple were rebuilt in a medieval revival style by Portwood in 1737–38.
- Barn Hill, Stamford. Portwood provided William Stukeley with designs for a frontage for Barn Hill House.

== Buildings likely to be by Portwood. ==
These are buildings attributed to Portwood by John Harris on their similarity to Portwood’s designs for Barn Hill.

- 21 High Street, Stamford
- 13 Barnhill, Stamford
- Leasingham Manor, Lincolnshire.

== Literature ==
- Antram N. (revised), Pevsner N. & Harris J., (1989), The Buildings of England: Lincolnshire, Yale University Press.
- Colvin H. A. (1995), Biographical Dictionary of British Architects 1600–1840. Yale University Press, 3rd edition London, p. 599.
- Harris J. (1965), The Architecture of Stamford, in Rogers A. (ed) The Making of Stamford, Leicester University Press
- Royal Commission on the Historical Monuments of England. 1977. An Inventory of Historical Monuments. The Town of Stamford No 239, pp. 104–06, plates 94, 119, 128, 133
- Smith J. F. ( 2013) William Stukeley in Stamford: His Houses, Gardens and a Project for a Palladian Triumphal Arch Over Barn Hill, Antiquaries Journal, Volume 93 September 2013, pp. 353–400
