= Relick Sunday =

Moveable feast in the Christian calendar

Relick Sunday (or Relic Sunday) is a moveable feast in the Christian calendar celebrated in mid July on the third Sunday after Midsummer's day. The feast celebrated Christian relics of all kinds, in which offerings were given to relics.

In England (Use of Sarum), the feast of relics fell in earlier times on the octave day of the nativity of blessed Mary (September 15), but in 1252 it was moved to the first Sunday after the Feast of the Translation of St. Thomas, therefore on the Sunday falling within July 8-14.

A manuscript from the late fifteenth century carrying a sermon entitled In festo Reliquarum describes its commemoration:

"Worshipfull frendis, on Sunday next commyng shall be the holy fest of all relykis (called Relike Sonday), which that be left here in erth to the grete magnificence, honour and worship of god and profite to man bothe bodily and gostily, for in as much as we be in sufficient to worship and reuerence singulerly all reuerent Relikis of all seyntis left here in erth, for it passith mannis power. Wherefore holy Chirch in especiall the Chirch of Yngelonde hathe ordeynd this holy Fest to be worshipped the next Sonday aftir the translacion of seint Thomas of Cauntirbery yerely to be hallowed and had in reuerence."

The Exeter Ordinal places this feast on Monday after the Feast of the Ascension.
